

81001–81100 

|-bgcolor=#fefefe
| 81001 ||  || — || March 5, 2000 || Socorro || LINEAR || V || align=right | 1.4 km || 
|-id=002 bgcolor=#fefefe
| 81002 ||  || — || March 5, 2000 || Socorro || LINEAR || V || align=right | 1.6 km || 
|-id=003 bgcolor=#fefefe
| 81003 ||  || — || March 5, 2000 || Socorro || LINEAR || — || align=right | 1.8 km || 
|-id=004 bgcolor=#fefefe
| 81004 ||  || — || March 5, 2000 || Socorro || LINEAR || V || align=right | 1.7 km || 
|-id=005 bgcolor=#E9E9E9
| 81005 ||  || — || March 5, 2000 || Socorro || LINEAR || MIT || align=right | 5.2 km || 
|-id=006 bgcolor=#E9E9E9
| 81006 ||  || — || March 5, 2000 || Socorro || LINEAR || EUN || align=right | 3.4 km || 
|-id=007 bgcolor=#fefefe
| 81007 ||  || — || March 5, 2000 || Socorro || LINEAR || — || align=right | 2.8 km || 
|-id=008 bgcolor=#E9E9E9
| 81008 ||  || — || March 5, 2000 || Socorro || LINEAR || EUN || align=right | 2.6 km || 
|-id=009 bgcolor=#fefefe
| 81009 ||  || — || March 5, 2000 || Socorro || LINEAR || EUT || align=right | 1.2 km || 
|-id=010 bgcolor=#fefefe
| 81010 ||  || — || March 8, 2000 || Socorro || LINEAR || SUL || align=right | 3.7 km || 
|-id=011 bgcolor=#fefefe
| 81011 ||  || — || March 4, 2000 || Socorro || LINEAR || — || align=right | 2.4 km || 
|-id=012 bgcolor=#fefefe
| 81012 ||  || — || March 8, 2000 || Socorro || LINEAR || NYS || align=right | 1.7 km || 
|-id=013 bgcolor=#E9E9E9
| 81013 ||  || — || March 8, 2000 || Socorro || LINEAR || — || align=right | 4.4 km || 
|-id=014 bgcolor=#E9E9E9
| 81014 ||  || — || March 8, 2000 || Socorro || LINEAR || — || align=right | 3.4 km || 
|-id=015 bgcolor=#fefefe
| 81015 ||  || — || March 8, 2000 || Socorro || LINEAR || NYS || align=right | 1.6 km || 
|-id=016 bgcolor=#E9E9E9
| 81016 ||  || — || March 8, 2000 || Socorro || LINEAR || — || align=right | 2.0 km || 
|-id=017 bgcolor=#fefefe
| 81017 ||  || — || March 8, 2000 || Socorro || LINEAR || MAS || align=right | 2.3 km || 
|-id=018 bgcolor=#E9E9E9
| 81018 ||  || — || March 8, 2000 || Socorro || LINEAR || — || align=right | 2.5 km || 
|-id=019 bgcolor=#E9E9E9
| 81019 ||  || — || March 8, 2000 || Socorro || LINEAR || — || align=right | 2.7 km || 
|-id=020 bgcolor=#E9E9E9
| 81020 ||  || — || March 8, 2000 || Socorro || LINEAR || — || align=right | 3.3 km || 
|-id=021 bgcolor=#E9E9E9
| 81021 ||  || — || March 8, 2000 || Socorro || LINEAR || — || align=right | 2.4 km || 
|-id=022 bgcolor=#E9E9E9
| 81022 ||  || — || March 8, 2000 || Socorro || LINEAR || — || align=right | 3.3 km || 
|-id=023 bgcolor=#fefefe
| 81023 ||  || — || March 8, 2000 || Socorro || LINEAR || — || align=right | 2.4 km || 
|-id=024 bgcolor=#E9E9E9
| 81024 ||  || — || March 8, 2000 || Socorro || LINEAR || — || align=right | 4.7 km || 
|-id=025 bgcolor=#E9E9E9
| 81025 ||  || — || March 8, 2000 || Socorro || LINEAR || — || align=right | 1.9 km || 
|-id=026 bgcolor=#E9E9E9
| 81026 ||  || — || March 9, 2000 || Socorro || LINEAR || — || align=right | 5.0 km || 
|-id=027 bgcolor=#fefefe
| 81027 ||  || — || March 9, 2000 || Socorro || LINEAR || — || align=right | 1.6 km || 
|-id=028 bgcolor=#fefefe
| 81028 ||  || — || March 9, 2000 || Socorro || LINEAR || — || align=right | 2.2 km || 
|-id=029 bgcolor=#E9E9E9
| 81029 ||  || — || March 9, 2000 || Socorro || LINEAR || — || align=right | 2.4 km || 
|-id=030 bgcolor=#E9E9E9
| 81030 ||  || — || March 9, 2000 || Socorro || LINEAR || — || align=right | 4.4 km || 
|-id=031 bgcolor=#E9E9E9
| 81031 ||  || — || March 9, 2000 || Socorro || LINEAR || — || align=right | 3.6 km || 
|-id=032 bgcolor=#E9E9E9
| 81032 ||  || — || March 9, 2000 || Socorro || LINEAR || — || align=right | 2.4 km || 
|-id=033 bgcolor=#fefefe
| 81033 ||  || — || March 9, 2000 || Socorro || LINEAR || — || align=right | 2.2 km || 
|-id=034 bgcolor=#E9E9E9
| 81034 ||  || — || March 9, 2000 || Socorro || LINEAR || DOR || align=right | 6.7 km || 
|-id=035 bgcolor=#fefefe
| 81035 ||  || — || March 9, 2000 || Socorro || LINEAR || — || align=right | 2.6 km || 
|-id=036 bgcolor=#E9E9E9
| 81036 ||  || — || March 10, 2000 || Kitt Peak || Spacewatch || — || align=right | 2.5 km || 
|-id=037 bgcolor=#E9E9E9
| 81037 ||  || — || March 11, 2000 || Prescott || P. G. Comba || — || align=right | 3.1 km || 
|-id=038 bgcolor=#fefefe
| 81038 ||  || — || March 5, 2000 || Socorro || LINEAR || NYS || align=right | 1.6 km || 
|-id=039 bgcolor=#fefefe
| 81039 ||  || — || March 8, 2000 || Socorro || LINEAR || — || align=right | 1.8 km || 
|-id=040 bgcolor=#E9E9E9
| 81040 ||  || — || March 8, 2000 || Socorro || LINEAR || INO || align=right | 4.0 km || 
|-id=041 bgcolor=#E9E9E9
| 81041 ||  || — || March 8, 2000 || Socorro || LINEAR || ADE || align=right | 5.4 km || 
|-id=042 bgcolor=#E9E9E9
| 81042 ||  || — || March 8, 2000 || Socorro || LINEAR || — || align=right | 4.5 km || 
|-id=043 bgcolor=#fefefe
| 81043 ||  || — || March 9, 2000 || Socorro || LINEAR || — || align=right | 2.3 km || 
|-id=044 bgcolor=#E9E9E9
| 81044 ||  || — || March 9, 2000 || Socorro || LINEAR || — || align=right | 2.8 km || 
|-id=045 bgcolor=#fefefe
| 81045 ||  || — || March 10, 2000 || Socorro || LINEAR || — || align=right | 2.0 km || 
|-id=046 bgcolor=#E9E9E9
| 81046 ||  || — || March 10, 2000 || Socorro || LINEAR || — || align=right | 2.6 km || 
|-id=047 bgcolor=#E9E9E9
| 81047 ||  || — || March 10, 2000 || Socorro || LINEAR || — || align=right | 1.7 km || 
|-id=048 bgcolor=#fefefe
| 81048 ||  || — || March 10, 2000 || Socorro || LINEAR || NYS || align=right | 1.2 km || 
|-id=049 bgcolor=#fefefe
| 81049 ||  || — || March 10, 2000 || Socorro || LINEAR || MAS || align=right | 1.9 km || 
|-id=050 bgcolor=#E9E9E9
| 81050 ||  || — || March 10, 2000 || Socorro || LINEAR || — || align=right | 1.6 km || 
|-id=051 bgcolor=#E9E9E9
| 81051 ||  || — || March 10, 2000 || Socorro || LINEAR || — || align=right | 1.8 km || 
|-id=052 bgcolor=#E9E9E9
| 81052 ||  || — || March 10, 2000 || Socorro || LINEAR || MAR || align=right | 3.9 km || 
|-id=053 bgcolor=#E9E9E9
| 81053 ||  || — || March 10, 2000 || Socorro || LINEAR || — || align=right | 5.3 km || 
|-id=054 bgcolor=#E9E9E9
| 81054 ||  || — || March 10, 2000 || Socorro || LINEAR || — || align=right | 2.8 km || 
|-id=055 bgcolor=#E9E9E9
| 81055 ||  || — || March 10, 2000 || Socorro || LINEAR || — || align=right | 2.6 km || 
|-id=056 bgcolor=#E9E9E9
| 81056 ||  || — || March 10, 2000 || Socorro || LINEAR || — || align=right | 2.6 km || 
|-id=057 bgcolor=#fefefe
| 81057 ||  || — || March 10, 2000 || Socorro || LINEAR || — || align=right | 2.1 km || 
|-id=058 bgcolor=#fefefe
| 81058 ||  || — || March 10, 2000 || Socorro || LINEAR || — || align=right | 3.7 km || 
|-id=059 bgcolor=#E9E9E9
| 81059 ||  || — || March 10, 2000 || Socorro || LINEAR || — || align=right | 5.0 km || 
|-id=060 bgcolor=#E9E9E9
| 81060 ||  || — || March 10, 2000 || Socorro || LINEAR || — || align=right | 2.6 km || 
|-id=061 bgcolor=#E9E9E9
| 81061 ||  || — || March 10, 2000 || Socorro || LINEAR || — || align=right | 2.4 km || 
|-id=062 bgcolor=#E9E9E9
| 81062 ||  || — || March 10, 2000 || Socorro || LINEAR || — || align=right | 2.5 km || 
|-id=063 bgcolor=#E9E9E9
| 81063 ||  || — || March 10, 2000 || Socorro || LINEAR || — || align=right | 6.3 km || 
|-id=064 bgcolor=#fefefe
| 81064 ||  || — || March 9, 2000 || Kitt Peak || Spacewatch || NYS || align=right | 1.2 km || 
|-id=065 bgcolor=#fefefe
| 81065 ||  || — || March 10, 2000 || Kitt Peak || Spacewatch || — || align=right | 1.7 km || 
|-id=066 bgcolor=#fefefe
| 81066 ||  || — || March 10, 2000 || Kitt Peak || Spacewatch || — || align=right | 1.4 km || 
|-id=067 bgcolor=#E9E9E9
| 81067 ||  || — || March 11, 2000 || Kitt Peak || Spacewatch || — || align=right | 2.5 km || 
|-id=068 bgcolor=#fefefe
| 81068 ||  || — || March 5, 2000 || Socorro || LINEAR || — || align=right | 3.3 km || 
|-id=069 bgcolor=#fefefe
| 81069 ||  || — || March 5, 2000 || Socorro || LINEAR || — || align=right | 2.1 km || 
|-id=070 bgcolor=#fefefe
| 81070 ||  || — || March 5, 2000 || Socorro || LINEAR || NYS || align=right | 1.6 km || 
|-id=071 bgcolor=#fefefe
| 81071 ||  || — || March 5, 2000 || Socorro || LINEAR || NYS || align=right | 1.5 km || 
|-id=072 bgcolor=#E9E9E9
| 81072 ||  || — || March 5, 2000 || Socorro || LINEAR || — || align=right | 2.2 km || 
|-id=073 bgcolor=#fefefe
| 81073 ||  || — || March 5, 2000 || Socorro || LINEAR || V || align=right | 1.8 km || 
|-id=074 bgcolor=#fefefe
| 81074 ||  || — || March 8, 2000 || Socorro || LINEAR || — || align=right | 6.6 km || 
|-id=075 bgcolor=#E9E9E9
| 81075 ||  || — || March 8, 2000 || Socorro || LINEAR || — || align=right | 2.8 km || 
|-id=076 bgcolor=#fefefe
| 81076 ||  || — || March 8, 2000 || Socorro || LINEAR || — || align=right | 1.9 km || 
|-id=077 bgcolor=#E9E9E9
| 81077 ||  || — || March 8, 2000 || Socorro || LINEAR || — || align=right | 6.8 km || 
|-id=078 bgcolor=#E9E9E9
| 81078 ||  || — || March 8, 2000 || Socorro || LINEAR || — || align=right | 2.5 km || 
|-id=079 bgcolor=#fefefe
| 81079 ||  || — || March 9, 2000 || Socorro || LINEAR || V || align=right | 1.4 km || 
|-id=080 bgcolor=#E9E9E9
| 81080 ||  || — || March 9, 2000 || Socorro || LINEAR || RAFfast? || align=right | 2.6 km || 
|-id=081 bgcolor=#fefefe
| 81081 ||  || — || March 9, 2000 || Socorro || LINEAR || — || align=right | 1.8 km || 
|-id=082 bgcolor=#E9E9E9
| 81082 ||  || — || March 9, 2000 || Socorro || LINEAR || — || align=right | 3.2 km || 
|-id=083 bgcolor=#E9E9E9
| 81083 ||  || — || March 9, 2000 || Socorro || LINEAR || — || align=right | 3.0 km || 
|-id=084 bgcolor=#fefefe
| 81084 ||  || — || March 9, 2000 || Socorro || LINEAR || V || align=right | 1.4 km || 
|-id=085 bgcolor=#E9E9E9
| 81085 ||  || — || March 9, 2000 || Socorro || LINEAR || RAF || align=right | 2.1 km || 
|-id=086 bgcolor=#E9E9E9
| 81086 ||  || — || March 9, 2000 || Socorro || LINEAR || — || align=right | 3.2 km || 
|-id=087 bgcolor=#E9E9E9
| 81087 ||  || — || March 9, 2000 || Socorro || LINEAR || — || align=right | 1.9 km || 
|-id=088 bgcolor=#fefefe
| 81088 ||  || — || March 9, 2000 || Socorro || LINEAR || — || align=right | 2.3 km || 
|-id=089 bgcolor=#fefefe
| 81089 ||  || — || March 9, 2000 || Socorro || LINEAR || V || align=right | 1.6 km || 
|-id=090 bgcolor=#E9E9E9
| 81090 ||  || — || March 9, 2000 || Socorro || LINEAR || — || align=right | 3.7 km || 
|-id=091 bgcolor=#E9E9E9
| 81091 ||  || — || March 10, 2000 || Socorro || LINEAR || — || align=right | 3.0 km || 
|-id=092 bgcolor=#fefefe
| 81092 ||  || — || March 12, 2000 || Kitt Peak || Spacewatch || NYS || align=right | 1.3 km || 
|-id=093 bgcolor=#E9E9E9
| 81093 ||  || — || March 14, 2000 || Kitt Peak || Spacewatch || — || align=right | 3.6 km || 
|-id=094 bgcolor=#fefefe
| 81094 ||  || — || March 13, 2000 || Socorro || LINEAR || — || align=right | 2.5 km || 
|-id=095 bgcolor=#E9E9E9
| 81095 ||  || — || March 11, 2000 || Anderson Mesa || LONEOS || — || align=right | 2.9 km || 
|-id=096 bgcolor=#E9E9E9
| 81096 ||  || — || March 11, 2000 || Anderson Mesa || LONEOS || — || align=right | 3.8 km || 
|-id=097 bgcolor=#fefefe
| 81097 ||  || — || March 5, 2000 || Haleakala || NEAT || V || align=right | 1.8 km || 
|-id=098 bgcolor=#E9E9E9
| 81098 ||  || — || March 8, 2000 || Socorro || LINEAR || — || align=right | 3.4 km || 
|-id=099 bgcolor=#fefefe
| 81099 ||  || — || March 8, 2000 || Haleakala || NEAT || — || align=right | 2.3 km || 
|-id=100 bgcolor=#fefefe
| 81100 ||  || — || March 8, 2000 || Haleakala || NEAT || V || align=right | 1.3 km || 
|}

81101–81200 

|-bgcolor=#E9E9E9
| 81101 ||  || — || March 8, 2000 || Haleakala || NEAT || ADE || align=right | 6.6 km || 
|-id=102 bgcolor=#fefefe
| 81102 ||  || — || March 8, 2000 || Haleakala || NEAT || — || align=right | 2.5 km || 
|-id=103 bgcolor=#fefefe
| 81103 ||  || — || March 9, 2000 || Socorro || LINEAR || V || align=right | 3.0 km || 
|-id=104 bgcolor=#fefefe
| 81104 ||  || — || March 9, 2000 || Socorro || LINEAR || — || align=right | 2.8 km || 
|-id=105 bgcolor=#E9E9E9
| 81105 ||  || — || March 9, 2000 || Socorro || LINEAR || — || align=right | 6.0 km || 
|-id=106 bgcolor=#fefefe
| 81106 ||  || — || March 10, 2000 || Kitt Peak || Spacewatch || V || align=right | 1.5 km || 
|-id=107 bgcolor=#E9E9E9
| 81107 ||  || — || March 10, 2000 || Socorro || LINEAR || — || align=right | 1.8 km || 
|-id=108 bgcolor=#fefefe
| 81108 ||  || — || March 11, 2000 || Anderson Mesa || LONEOS || — || align=right | 3.4 km || 
|-id=109 bgcolor=#fefefe
| 81109 ||  || — || March 11, 2000 || Anderson Mesa || LONEOS || — || align=right | 2.1 km || 
|-id=110 bgcolor=#fefefe
| 81110 ||  || — || March 11, 2000 || Anderson Mesa || LONEOS || V || align=right | 1.7 km || 
|-id=111 bgcolor=#E9E9E9
| 81111 ||  || — || March 11, 2000 || Anderson Mesa || LONEOS || EUN || align=right | 3.0 km || 
|-id=112 bgcolor=#fefefe
| 81112 ||  || — || March 11, 2000 || Anderson Mesa || LONEOS || MAS || align=right | 1.7 km || 
|-id=113 bgcolor=#E9E9E9
| 81113 ||  || — || March 11, 2000 || Anderson Mesa || LONEOS || — || align=right | 4.3 km || 
|-id=114 bgcolor=#fefefe
| 81114 ||  || — || March 11, 2000 || Anderson Mesa || LONEOS || — || align=right | 2.1 km || 
|-id=115 bgcolor=#E9E9E9
| 81115 ||  || — || March 11, 2000 || Anderson Mesa || LONEOS || — || align=right | 1.8 km || 
|-id=116 bgcolor=#fefefe
| 81116 ||  || — || March 11, 2000 || Anderson Mesa || LONEOS || NYS || align=right | 1.5 km || 
|-id=117 bgcolor=#fefefe
| 81117 ||  || — || March 11, 2000 || Anderson Mesa || LONEOS || NYS || align=right | 1.6 km || 
|-id=118 bgcolor=#fefefe
| 81118 ||  || — || March 11, 2000 || Anderson Mesa || LONEOS || — || align=right | 1.5 km || 
|-id=119 bgcolor=#fefefe
| 81119 ||  || — || March 11, 2000 || Anderson Mesa || LONEOS || NYS || align=right | 1.9 km || 
|-id=120 bgcolor=#E9E9E9
| 81120 ||  || — || March 11, 2000 || Anderson Mesa || LONEOS || — || align=right | 2.2 km || 
|-id=121 bgcolor=#E9E9E9
| 81121 ||  || — || March 11, 2000 || Anderson Mesa || LONEOS || MIS || align=right | 4.1 km || 
|-id=122 bgcolor=#E9E9E9
| 81122 ||  || — || March 11, 2000 || Anderson Mesa || LONEOS || — || align=right | 3.4 km || 
|-id=123 bgcolor=#fefefe
| 81123 ||  || — || March 11, 2000 || Anderson Mesa || LONEOS || — || align=right | 1.8 km || 
|-id=124 bgcolor=#fefefe
| 81124 ||  || — || March 11, 2000 || Anderson Mesa || LONEOS || — || align=right | 4.2 km || 
|-id=125 bgcolor=#E9E9E9
| 81125 ||  || — || March 11, 2000 || Anderson Mesa || LONEOS || — || align=right | 3.3 km || 
|-id=126 bgcolor=#E9E9E9
| 81126 ||  || — || March 11, 2000 || Anderson Mesa || LONEOS || — || align=right | 6.2 km || 
|-id=127 bgcolor=#fefefe
| 81127 ||  || — || March 11, 2000 || Anderson Mesa || LONEOS || MAS || align=right | 2.1 km || 
|-id=128 bgcolor=#fefefe
| 81128 ||  || — || March 11, 2000 || Anderson Mesa || LONEOS || — || align=right | 2.0 km || 
|-id=129 bgcolor=#E9E9E9
| 81129 ||  || — || March 11, 2000 || Anderson Mesa || LONEOS || MIS || align=right | 2.8 km || 
|-id=130 bgcolor=#E9E9E9
| 81130 ||  || — || March 11, 2000 || Socorro || LINEAR || HEN || align=right | 2.7 km || 
|-id=131 bgcolor=#fefefe
| 81131 ||  || — || March 11, 2000 || Anderson Mesa || LONEOS || — || align=right | 2.2 km || 
|-id=132 bgcolor=#E9E9E9
| 81132 ||  || — || March 11, 2000 || Anderson Mesa || LONEOS || — || align=right | 4.8 km || 
|-id=133 bgcolor=#E9E9E9
| 81133 ||  || — || March 11, 2000 || Anderson Mesa || LONEOS || RAF || align=right | 2.1 km || 
|-id=134 bgcolor=#E9E9E9
| 81134 ||  || — || March 11, 2000 || Anderson Mesa || LONEOS || PAE || align=right | 6.4 km || 
|-id=135 bgcolor=#E9E9E9
| 81135 ||  || — || March 11, 2000 || Anderson Mesa || LONEOS || — || align=right | 2.6 km || 
|-id=136 bgcolor=#E9E9E9
| 81136 ||  || — || March 11, 2000 || Anderson Mesa || LONEOS || — || align=right | 2.5 km || 
|-id=137 bgcolor=#fefefe
| 81137 ||  || — || March 11, 2000 || Anderson Mesa || LONEOS || V || align=right | 1.6 km || 
|-id=138 bgcolor=#E9E9E9
| 81138 ||  || — || March 11, 2000 || Socorro || LINEAR || MRX || align=right | 1.2 km || 
|-id=139 bgcolor=#E9E9E9
| 81139 ||  || — || March 11, 2000 || Socorro || LINEAR || — || align=right | 1.6 km || 
|-id=140 bgcolor=#fefefe
| 81140 ||  || — || March 12, 2000 || Socorro || LINEAR || ERI || align=right | 4.0 km || 
|-id=141 bgcolor=#E9E9E9
| 81141 ||  || — || March 7, 2000 || Socorro || LINEAR || MAR || align=right | 2.8 km || 
|-id=142 bgcolor=#E9E9E9
| 81142 ||  || — || March 11, 2000 || Catalina || CSS || — || align=right | 7.4 km || 
|-id=143 bgcolor=#E9E9E9
| 81143 ||  || — || March 12, 2000 || Catalina || CSS || — || align=right | 3.8 km || 
|-id=144 bgcolor=#E9E9E9
| 81144 ||  || — || March 12, 2000 || Catalina || CSS || — || align=right | 3.8 km || 
|-id=145 bgcolor=#E9E9E9
| 81145 ||  || — || March 2, 2000 || Catalina || CSS || — || align=right | 1.9 km || 
|-id=146 bgcolor=#E9E9E9
| 81146 ||  || — || March 3, 2000 || Catalina || CSS || ADE || align=right | 5.0 km || 
|-id=147 bgcolor=#E9E9E9
| 81147 ||  || — || March 3, 2000 || Catalina || CSS || — || align=right | 2.6 km || 
|-id=148 bgcolor=#fefefe
| 81148 ||  || — || March 3, 2000 || Catalina || CSS || V || align=right | 1.6 km || 
|-id=149 bgcolor=#fefefe
| 81149 ||  || — || March 4, 2000 || Socorro || LINEAR || — || align=right | 2.6 km || 
|-id=150 bgcolor=#E9E9E9
| 81150 ||  || — || March 4, 2000 || Socorro || LINEAR || — || align=right | 2.7 km || 
|-id=151 bgcolor=#E9E9E9
| 81151 ||  || — || March 4, 2000 || Socorro || LINEAR || MIT || align=right | 2.9 km || 
|-id=152 bgcolor=#E9E9E9
| 81152 ||  || — || March 4, 2000 || Catalina || CSS || EUN || align=right | 4.3 km || 
|-id=153 bgcolor=#fefefe
| 81153 ||  || — || March 5, 2000 || Haleakala || NEAT || — || align=right | 2.6 km || 
|-id=154 bgcolor=#E9E9E9
| 81154 ||  || — || March 6, 2000 || Haleakala || NEAT || MAR || align=right | 2.7 km || 
|-id=155 bgcolor=#E9E9E9
| 81155 ||  || — || March 6, 2000 || Haleakala || NEAT || — || align=right | 3.4 km || 
|-id=156 bgcolor=#E9E9E9
| 81156 ||  || — || March 6, 2000 || Haleakala || NEAT || ADE || align=right | 7.3 km || 
|-id=157 bgcolor=#E9E9E9
| 81157 ||  || — || March 6, 2000 || Haleakala || NEAT || — || align=right | 2.5 km || 
|-id=158 bgcolor=#E9E9E9
| 81158 ||  || — || March 6, 2000 || Haleakala || NEAT || — || align=right | 5.0 km || 
|-id=159 bgcolor=#fefefe
| 81159 ||  || — || March 6, 2000 || Haleakala || NEAT || — || align=right | 1.9 km || 
|-id=160 bgcolor=#E9E9E9
| 81160 ||  || — || March 6, 2000 || Haleakala || NEAT || — || align=right | 3.0 km || 
|-id=161 bgcolor=#E9E9E9
| 81161 ||  || — || March 10, 2000 || Socorro || LINEAR || — || align=right | 2.4 km || 
|-id=162 bgcolor=#E9E9E9
| 81162 ||  || — || March 12, 2000 || Anderson Mesa || LONEOS || JUN || align=right | 2.2 km || 
|-id=163 bgcolor=#E9E9E9
| 81163 ||  || — || March 12, 2000 || Anderson Mesa || LONEOS || EUN || align=right | 3.7 km || 
|-id=164 bgcolor=#E9E9E9
| 81164 ||  || — || March 3, 2000 || Socorro || LINEAR || — || align=right | 2.2 km || 
|-id=165 bgcolor=#E9E9E9
| 81165 ||  || — || March 3, 2000 || Socorro || LINEAR || ADE || align=right | 5.3 km || 
|-id=166 bgcolor=#fefefe
| 81166 ||  || — || March 3, 2000 || Socorro || LINEAR || — || align=right | 1.8 km || 
|-id=167 bgcolor=#E9E9E9
| 81167 ||  || — || March 3, 2000 || Socorro || LINEAR || HEN || align=right | 2.9 km || 
|-id=168 bgcolor=#E9E9E9
| 81168 ||  || — || March 3, 2000 || Socorro || LINEAR || — || align=right | 1.8 km || 
|-id=169 bgcolor=#fefefe
| 81169 ||  || — || March 3, 2000 || Socorro || LINEAR || — || align=right | 1.8 km || 
|-id=170 bgcolor=#E9E9E9
| 81170 ||  || — || March 3, 2000 || Socorro || LINEAR || — || align=right | 3.4 km || 
|-id=171 bgcolor=#fefefe
| 81171 ||  || — || March 3, 2000 || Socorro || LINEAR || V || align=right | 1.7 km || 
|-id=172 bgcolor=#fefefe
| 81172 ||  || — || March 4, 2000 || Socorro || LINEAR || V || align=right | 1.5 km || 
|-id=173 bgcolor=#d6d6d6
| 81173 ||  || — || March 4, 2000 || Socorro || LINEAR || BRA || align=right | 4.2 km || 
|-id=174 bgcolor=#fefefe
| 81174 ||  || — || March 5, 2000 || Socorro || LINEAR || — || align=right | 2.5 km || 
|-id=175 bgcolor=#fefefe
| 81175 ||  || — || March 5, 2000 || Socorro || LINEAR || V || align=right | 2.3 km || 
|-id=176 bgcolor=#fefefe
| 81176 ||  || — || March 5, 2000 || Socorro || LINEAR || — || align=right | 2.6 km || 
|-id=177 bgcolor=#fefefe
| 81177 ||  || — || March 4, 2000 || Socorro || LINEAR || — || align=right | 3.1 km || 
|-id=178 bgcolor=#fefefe
| 81178 ||  || — || March 2, 2000 || Catalina || CSS || V || align=right | 1.5 km || 
|-id=179 bgcolor=#E9E9E9
| 81179 ||  || — || March 4, 2000 || Socorro || LINEAR || — || align=right | 1.7 km || 
|-id=180 bgcolor=#E9E9E9
| 81180 ||  || — || March 4, 2000 || Socorro || LINEAR || — || align=right | 2.2 km || 
|-id=181 bgcolor=#fefefe
| 81181 ||  || — || March 4, 2000 || Socorro || LINEAR || — || align=right | 2.3 km || 
|-id=182 bgcolor=#d6d6d6
| 81182 ||  || — || March 5, 2000 || Socorro || LINEAR || — || align=right | 3.9 km || 
|-id=183 bgcolor=#fefefe
| 81183 ||  || — || March 5, 2000 || Socorro || LINEAR || — || align=right | 2.3 km || 
|-id=184 bgcolor=#fefefe
| 81184 ||  || — || March 2, 2000 || Kitt Peak || Spacewatch || NYS || align=right | 1.3 km || 
|-id=185 bgcolor=#fefefe
| 81185 ||  || — || March 2, 2000 || Catalina || CSS || — || align=right | 1.5 km || 
|-id=186 bgcolor=#fefefe
| 81186 ||  || — || March 3, 2000 || Socorro || LINEAR || — || align=right | 1.6 km || 
|-id=187 bgcolor=#E9E9E9
| 81187 ||  || — || March 3, 2000 || Socorro || LINEAR || — || align=right | 1.9 km || 
|-id=188 bgcolor=#E9E9E9
| 81188 ||  || — || March 3, 2000 || Socorro || LINEAR || — || align=right | 2.5 km || 
|-id=189 bgcolor=#E9E9E9
| 81189 ||  || — || March 3, 2000 || Socorro || LINEAR || — || align=right | 1.9 km || 
|-id=190 bgcolor=#E9E9E9
| 81190 ||  || — || March 3, 2000 || Socorro || LINEAR || — || align=right | 3.1 km || 
|-id=191 bgcolor=#E9E9E9
| 81191 ||  || — || March 3, 2000 || Socorro || LINEAR || — || align=right | 2.1 km || 
|-id=192 bgcolor=#E9E9E9
| 81192 ||  || — || March 3, 2000 || Socorro || LINEAR || — || align=right | 1.8 km || 
|-id=193 bgcolor=#E9E9E9
| 81193 ||  || — || March 1, 2000 || Catalina || CSS || — || align=right | 2.7 km || 
|-id=194 bgcolor=#fefefe
| 81194 ||  || — || March 1, 2000 || Catalina || CSS || V || align=right | 2.1 km || 
|-id=195 bgcolor=#E9E9E9
| 81195 ||  || — || March 1, 2000 || Catalina || CSS || HNS || align=right | 4.9 km || 
|-id=196 bgcolor=#E9E9E9
| 81196 ||  || — || March 25, 2000 || Kitt Peak || Spacewatch || — || align=right | 3.6 km || 
|-id=197 bgcolor=#E9E9E9
| 81197 ||  || — || March 26, 2000 || Kitt Peak || Spacewatch || — || align=right | 4.1 km || 
|-id=198 bgcolor=#E9E9E9
| 81198 ||  || — || March 27, 2000 || Kitt Peak || Spacewatch || — || align=right | 4.8 km || 
|-id=199 bgcolor=#fefefe
| 81199 ||  || — || March 25, 2000 || Kitt Peak || Spacewatch || — || align=right | 1.6 km || 
|-id=200 bgcolor=#E9E9E9
| 81200 ||  || — || March 25, 2000 || Kitt Peak || Spacewatch || AGN || align=right | 2.1 km || 
|}

81201–81300 

|-bgcolor=#E9E9E9
| 81201 ||  || — || March 25, 2000 || Kitt Peak || Spacewatch || — || align=right | 4.5 km || 
|-id=202 bgcolor=#E9E9E9
| 81202 ||  || — || March 29, 2000 || Kitt Peak || Spacewatch || — || align=right | 4.2 km || 
|-id=203 bgcolor=#E9E9E9
| 81203 Polynesia ||  ||  || March 23, 2000 || Punaauia || J.-C. Pelle || — || align=right | 3.9 km || 
|-id=204 bgcolor=#E9E9E9
| 81204 ||  || — || March 30, 2000 || Kitt Peak || Spacewatch || — || align=right | 1.9 km || 
|-id=205 bgcolor=#d6d6d6
| 81205 ||  || — || March 30, 2000 || Kitt Peak || Spacewatch || KOR || align=right | 3.4 km || 
|-id=206 bgcolor=#E9E9E9
| 81206 ||  || — || March 30, 2000 || Višnjan Observatory || K. Korlević || ADE || align=right | 5.1 km || 
|-id=207 bgcolor=#E9E9E9
| 81207 ||  || — || March 29, 2000 || Kvistaberg || UDAS || — || align=right | 2.5 km || 
|-id=208 bgcolor=#fefefe
| 81208 ||  || — || March 28, 2000 || Socorro || LINEAR || NYS || align=right | 1.5 km || 
|-id=209 bgcolor=#fefefe
| 81209 ||  || — || March 28, 2000 || Socorro || LINEAR || — || align=right | 2.3 km || 
|-id=210 bgcolor=#E9E9E9
| 81210 ||  || — || March 28, 2000 || Socorro || LINEAR || — || align=right | 3.4 km || 
|-id=211 bgcolor=#fefefe
| 81211 ||  || — || March 28, 2000 || Socorro || LINEAR || — || align=right | 5.5 km || 
|-id=212 bgcolor=#fefefe
| 81212 ||  || — || March 29, 2000 || Socorro || LINEAR || LCI || align=right | 2.5 km || 
|-id=213 bgcolor=#E9E9E9
| 81213 ||  || — || March 29, 2000 || Socorro || LINEAR || — || align=right | 5.2 km || 
|-id=214 bgcolor=#E9E9E9
| 81214 ||  || — || March 29, 2000 || Socorro || LINEAR || — || align=right | 6.6 km || 
|-id=215 bgcolor=#E9E9E9
| 81215 ||  || — || March 29, 2000 || Socorro || LINEAR || — || align=right | 3.1 km || 
|-id=216 bgcolor=#E9E9E9
| 81216 ||  || — || March 29, 2000 || Socorro || LINEAR || — || align=right | 3.1 km || 
|-id=217 bgcolor=#E9E9E9
| 81217 ||  || — || March 29, 2000 || Socorro || LINEAR || EUN || align=right | 2.5 km || 
|-id=218 bgcolor=#E9E9E9
| 81218 ||  || — || March 29, 2000 || Socorro || LINEAR || — || align=right | 7.6 km || 
|-id=219 bgcolor=#fefefe
| 81219 ||  || — || March 29, 2000 || Socorro || LINEAR || — || align=right | 3.0 km || 
|-id=220 bgcolor=#E9E9E9
| 81220 ||  || — || March 29, 2000 || Socorro || LINEAR || EUN || align=right | 2.7 km || 
|-id=221 bgcolor=#d6d6d6
| 81221 ||  || — || March 29, 2000 || Socorro || LINEAR || — || align=right | 4.9 km || 
|-id=222 bgcolor=#E9E9E9
| 81222 ||  || — || March 29, 2000 || Socorro || LINEAR || — || align=right | 6.1 km || 
|-id=223 bgcolor=#E9E9E9
| 81223 ||  || — || March 29, 2000 || Socorro || LINEAR || — || align=right | 3.4 km || 
|-id=224 bgcolor=#E9E9E9
| 81224 ||  || — || March 29, 2000 || Socorro || LINEAR || — || align=right | 3.0 km || 
|-id=225 bgcolor=#E9E9E9
| 81225 ||  || — || March 29, 2000 || Socorro || LINEAR || EUN || align=right | 4.6 km || 
|-id=226 bgcolor=#fefefe
| 81226 ||  || — || March 29, 2000 || Socorro || LINEAR || — || align=right | 5.8 km || 
|-id=227 bgcolor=#E9E9E9
| 81227 ||  || — || March 29, 2000 || Socorro || LINEAR || — || align=right | 3.4 km || 
|-id=228 bgcolor=#fefefe
| 81228 ||  || — || March 26, 2000 || Anderson Mesa || LONEOS || MAS || align=right | 2.0 km || 
|-id=229 bgcolor=#fefefe
| 81229 ||  || — || March 27, 2000 || Anderson Mesa || LONEOS || NYS || align=right | 2.3 km || 
|-id=230 bgcolor=#E9E9E9
| 81230 ||  || — || March 27, 2000 || Anderson Mesa || LONEOS || EUN || align=right | 3.4 km || 
|-id=231 bgcolor=#E9E9E9
| 81231 ||  || — || March 27, 2000 || Anderson Mesa || LONEOS || — || align=right | 2.9 km || 
|-id=232 bgcolor=#E9E9E9
| 81232 ||  || — || March 27, 2000 || Anderson Mesa || LONEOS || — || align=right | 1.7 km || 
|-id=233 bgcolor=#fefefe
| 81233 ||  || — || March 27, 2000 || Anderson Mesa || LONEOS || — || align=right | 3.9 km || 
|-id=234 bgcolor=#E9E9E9
| 81234 ||  || — || March 27, 2000 || Anderson Mesa || LONEOS || — || align=right | 3.6 km || 
|-id=235 bgcolor=#E9E9E9
| 81235 ||  || — || March 27, 2000 || Anderson Mesa || LONEOS || HEN || align=right | 2.3 km || 
|-id=236 bgcolor=#E9E9E9
| 81236 ||  || — || March 27, 2000 || Anderson Mesa || LONEOS || HNS || align=right | 3.9 km || 
|-id=237 bgcolor=#E9E9E9
| 81237 ||  || — || March 27, 2000 || Anderson Mesa || LONEOS || — || align=right | 2.3 km || 
|-id=238 bgcolor=#E9E9E9
| 81238 ||  || — || March 27, 2000 || Anderson Mesa || LONEOS || — || align=right | 3.5 km || 
|-id=239 bgcolor=#E9E9E9
| 81239 ||  || — || March 27, 2000 || Anderson Mesa || LONEOS || — || align=right | 3.3 km || 
|-id=240 bgcolor=#d6d6d6
| 81240 ||  || — || March 27, 2000 || Anderson Mesa || LONEOS || — || align=right | 7.8 km || 
|-id=241 bgcolor=#E9E9E9
| 81241 ||  || — || March 27, 2000 || Anderson Mesa || LONEOS || — || align=right | 2.9 km || 
|-id=242 bgcolor=#E9E9E9
| 81242 ||  || — || March 27, 2000 || Anderson Mesa || LONEOS || GEF || align=right | 2.4 km || 
|-id=243 bgcolor=#E9E9E9
| 81243 ||  || — || March 28, 2000 || Socorro || LINEAR || — || align=right | 3.3 km || 
|-id=244 bgcolor=#E9E9E9
| 81244 ||  || — || March 29, 2000 || Socorro || LINEAR || — || align=right | 2.9 km || 
|-id=245 bgcolor=#fefefe
| 81245 ||  || — || March 29, 2000 || Socorro || LINEAR || V || align=right | 1.7 km || 
|-id=246 bgcolor=#E9E9E9
| 81246 ||  || — || March 29, 2000 || Socorro || LINEAR || — || align=right | 3.0 km || 
|-id=247 bgcolor=#E9E9E9
| 81247 ||  || — || March 29, 2000 || Socorro || LINEAR || EUN || align=right | 2.6 km || 
|-id=248 bgcolor=#E9E9E9
| 81248 ||  || — || March 29, 2000 || Socorro || LINEAR || — || align=right | 3.0 km || 
|-id=249 bgcolor=#E9E9E9
| 81249 ||  || — || March 29, 2000 || Socorro || LINEAR || HOF || align=right | 6.4 km || 
|-id=250 bgcolor=#E9E9E9
| 81250 ||  || — || March 29, 2000 || Socorro || LINEAR || RAF || align=right | 1.8 km || 
|-id=251 bgcolor=#E9E9E9
| 81251 ||  || — || March 29, 2000 || Socorro || LINEAR || — || align=right | 4.6 km || 
|-id=252 bgcolor=#E9E9E9
| 81252 ||  || — || March 29, 2000 || Socorro || LINEAR || — || align=right | 4.1 km || 
|-id=253 bgcolor=#E9E9E9
| 81253 ||  || — || March 29, 2000 || Socorro || LINEAR || — || align=right | 2.9 km || 
|-id=254 bgcolor=#E9E9E9
| 81254 ||  || — || March 29, 2000 || Socorro || LINEAR || — || align=right | 2.6 km || 
|-id=255 bgcolor=#E9E9E9
| 81255 ||  || — || March 29, 2000 || Socorro || LINEAR || — || align=right | 1.9 km || 
|-id=256 bgcolor=#fefefe
| 81256 ||  || — || March 29, 2000 || Socorro || LINEAR || — || align=right | 1.6 km || 
|-id=257 bgcolor=#E9E9E9
| 81257 ||  || — || March 29, 2000 || Socorro || LINEAR || — || align=right | 3.0 km || 
|-id=258 bgcolor=#E9E9E9
| 81258 ||  || — || March 29, 2000 || Socorro || LINEAR || — || align=right | 3.1 km || 
|-id=259 bgcolor=#fefefe
| 81259 ||  || — || March 29, 2000 || Socorro || LINEAR || MAS || align=right | 2.3 km || 
|-id=260 bgcolor=#E9E9E9
| 81260 ||  || — || March 29, 2000 || Socorro || LINEAR || — || align=right | 2.2 km || 
|-id=261 bgcolor=#fefefe
| 81261 ||  || — || March 29, 2000 || Socorro || LINEAR || — || align=right | 3.1 km || 
|-id=262 bgcolor=#E9E9E9
| 81262 ||  || — || March 29, 2000 || Socorro || LINEAR || — || align=right | 2.9 km || 
|-id=263 bgcolor=#fefefe
| 81263 ||  || — || March 29, 2000 || Socorro || LINEAR || V || align=right | 1.4 km || 
|-id=264 bgcolor=#E9E9E9
| 81264 ||  || — || March 29, 2000 || Socorro || LINEAR || MAR || align=right | 1.7 km || 
|-id=265 bgcolor=#E9E9E9
| 81265 ||  || — || March 29, 2000 || Socorro || LINEAR || — || align=right | 2.8 km || 
|-id=266 bgcolor=#fefefe
| 81266 ||  || — || March 29, 2000 || Socorro || LINEAR || V || align=right | 1.5 km || 
|-id=267 bgcolor=#fefefe
| 81267 ||  || — || March 29, 2000 || Socorro || LINEAR || — || align=right | 3.1 km || 
|-id=268 bgcolor=#E9E9E9
| 81268 ||  || — || March 29, 2000 || Socorro || LINEAR || — || align=right | 2.5 km || 
|-id=269 bgcolor=#E9E9E9
| 81269 ||  || — || March 29, 2000 || Socorro || LINEAR || — || align=right | 2.8 km || 
|-id=270 bgcolor=#E9E9E9
| 81270 ||  || — || March 29, 2000 || Socorro || LINEAR || — || align=right | 2.5 km || 
|-id=271 bgcolor=#d6d6d6
| 81271 ||  || — || March 30, 2000 || Socorro || LINEAR || BRA || align=right | 5.3 km || 
|-id=272 bgcolor=#E9E9E9
| 81272 ||  || — || March 30, 2000 || Socorro || LINEAR || ADE || align=right | 4.6 km || 
|-id=273 bgcolor=#E9E9E9
| 81273 ||  || — || March 30, 2000 || Socorro || LINEAR || — || align=right | 3.4 km || 
|-id=274 bgcolor=#E9E9E9
| 81274 ||  || — || March 29, 2000 || Kitt Peak || Spacewatch || — || align=right | 2.1 km || 
|-id=275 bgcolor=#E9E9E9
| 81275 ||  || — || March 30, 2000 || Kitt Peak || Spacewatch || — || align=right | 3.3 km || 
|-id=276 bgcolor=#fefefe
| 81276 ||  || — || March 27, 2000 || Anderson Mesa || LONEOS || V || align=right | 1.2 km || 
|-id=277 bgcolor=#E9E9E9
| 81277 ||  || — || March 29, 2000 || Socorro || LINEAR || — || align=right | 2.3 km || 
|-id=278 bgcolor=#E9E9E9
| 81278 ||  || — || March 29, 2000 || Socorro || LINEAR || PAD || align=right | 3.5 km || 
|-id=279 bgcolor=#fefefe
| 81279 ||  || — || March 29, 2000 || Socorro || LINEAR || V || align=right | 1.4 km || 
|-id=280 bgcolor=#E9E9E9
| 81280 ||  || — || March 29, 2000 || Socorro || LINEAR || — || align=right | 1.8 km || 
|-id=281 bgcolor=#fefefe
| 81281 ||  || — || March 26, 2000 || Anderson Mesa || LONEOS || — || align=right | 2.9 km || 
|-id=282 bgcolor=#fefefe
| 81282 ||  || — || March 28, 2000 || Socorro || LINEAR || V || align=right | 2.0 km || 
|-id=283 bgcolor=#E9E9E9
| 81283 ||  || — || March 29, 2000 || Socorro || LINEAR || — || align=right | 2.4 km || 
|-id=284 bgcolor=#E9E9E9
| 81284 ||  || — || March 29, 2000 || Socorro || LINEAR || — || align=right | 3.7 km || 
|-id=285 bgcolor=#E9E9E9
| 81285 ||  || — || March 29, 2000 || Socorro || LINEAR || — || align=right | 3.3 km || 
|-id=286 bgcolor=#E9E9E9
| 81286 ||  || — || March 29, 2000 || Socorro || LINEAR || MAR || align=right | 3.0 km || 
|-id=287 bgcolor=#E9E9E9
| 81287 ||  || — || March 26, 2000 || Anderson Mesa || LONEOS || — || align=right | 3.0 km || 
|-id=288 bgcolor=#E9E9E9
| 81288 ||  || — || March 29, 2000 || Socorro || LINEAR || AGN || align=right | 2.8 km || 
|-id=289 bgcolor=#fefefe
| 81289 ||  || — || March 26, 2000 || Anderson Mesa || LONEOS || — || align=right | 2.0 km || 
|-id=290 bgcolor=#E9E9E9
| 81290 ||  || — || March 27, 2000 || Anderson Mesa || LONEOS || WIT || align=right | 2.2 km || 
|-id=291 bgcolor=#E9E9E9
| 81291 ||  || — || March 27, 2000 || Kitt Peak || Spacewatch || — || align=right | 4.8 km || 
|-id=292 bgcolor=#E9E9E9
| 81292 ||  || — || March 26, 2000 || Anderson Mesa || LONEOS || — || align=right | 3.7 km || 
|-id=293 bgcolor=#E9E9E9
| 81293 ||  || — || March 25, 2000 || Kitt Peak || Spacewatch || — || align=right | 2.1 km || 
|-id=294 bgcolor=#E9E9E9
| 81294 || 2000 GM || — || April 2, 2000 || Prescott || P. G. Comba || — || align=right | 3.2 km || 
|-id=295 bgcolor=#E9E9E9
| 81295 || 2000 GU || — || April 2, 2000 || Kitt Peak || Spacewatch || — || align=right | 1.8 km || 
|-id=296 bgcolor=#E9E9E9
| 81296 ||  || — || April 2, 2000 || Socorro || LINEAR || — || align=right | 2.4 km || 
|-id=297 bgcolor=#E9E9E9
| 81297 ||  || — || April 4, 2000 || Prescott || P. G. Comba || — || align=right | 8.6 km || 
|-id=298 bgcolor=#fefefe
| 81298 ||  || — || April 4, 2000 || Socorro || LINEAR || PHO || align=right | 4.8 km || 
|-id=299 bgcolor=#E9E9E9
| 81299 ||  || — || April 2, 2000 || Socorro || LINEAR || ADE || align=right | 4.3 km || 
|-id=300 bgcolor=#fefefe
| 81300 ||  || — || April 3, 2000 || Socorro || LINEAR || — || align=right | 3.7 km || 
|}

81301–81400 

|-bgcolor=#E9E9E9
| 81301 ||  || — || April 5, 2000 || Socorro || LINEAR || BAR || align=right | 2.2 km || 
|-id=302 bgcolor=#E9E9E9
| 81302 ||  || — || April 3, 2000 || Socorro || LINEAR || — || align=right | 3.4 km || 
|-id=303 bgcolor=#E9E9E9
| 81303 ||  || — || April 4, 2000 || Socorro || LINEAR || — || align=right | 5.4 km || 
|-id=304 bgcolor=#E9E9E9
| 81304 ||  || — || April 4, 2000 || Socorro || LINEAR || — || align=right | 3.5 km || 
|-id=305 bgcolor=#E9E9E9
| 81305 ||  || — || April 4, 2000 || Socorro || LINEAR || — || align=right | 2.8 km || 
|-id=306 bgcolor=#E9E9E9
| 81306 ||  || — || April 4, 2000 || Socorro || LINEAR || CLO || align=right | 4.4 km || 
|-id=307 bgcolor=#fefefe
| 81307 ||  || — || April 5, 2000 || Socorro || LINEAR || — || align=right | 1.9 km || 
|-id=308 bgcolor=#E9E9E9
| 81308 ||  || — || April 5, 2000 || Socorro || LINEAR || — || align=right | 2.4 km || 
|-id=309 bgcolor=#fefefe
| 81309 ||  || — || April 5, 2000 || Socorro || LINEAR || MAS || align=right | 1.9 km || 
|-id=310 bgcolor=#E9E9E9
| 81310 ||  || — || April 5, 2000 || Socorro || LINEAR || — || align=right | 1.7 km || 
|-id=311 bgcolor=#E9E9E9
| 81311 ||  || — || April 5, 2000 || Socorro || LINEAR || — || align=right | 3.2 km || 
|-id=312 bgcolor=#E9E9E9
| 81312 ||  || — || April 5, 2000 || Socorro || LINEAR || — || align=right | 2.5 km || 
|-id=313 bgcolor=#E9E9E9
| 81313 ||  || — || April 5, 2000 || Socorro || LINEAR || — || align=right | 2.6 km || 
|-id=314 bgcolor=#E9E9E9
| 81314 ||  || — || April 5, 2000 || Socorro || LINEAR || — || align=right | 2.2 km || 
|-id=315 bgcolor=#E9E9E9
| 81315 ||  || — || April 5, 2000 || Socorro || LINEAR || — || align=right | 2.4 km || 
|-id=316 bgcolor=#E9E9E9
| 81316 ||  || — || April 5, 2000 || Socorro || LINEAR || HEN || align=right | 2.1 km || 
|-id=317 bgcolor=#E9E9E9
| 81317 ||  || — || April 5, 2000 || Socorro || LINEAR || — || align=right | 3.2 km || 
|-id=318 bgcolor=#E9E9E9
| 81318 ||  || — || April 5, 2000 || Socorro || LINEAR || — || align=right | 1.7 km || 
|-id=319 bgcolor=#fefefe
| 81319 ||  || — || April 5, 2000 || Socorro || LINEAR || — || align=right | 1.8 km || 
|-id=320 bgcolor=#E9E9E9
| 81320 ||  || — || April 5, 2000 || Socorro || LINEAR || ADE || align=right | 5.0 km || 
|-id=321 bgcolor=#E9E9E9
| 81321 ||  || — || April 5, 2000 || Socorro || LINEAR || — || align=right | 2.8 km || 
|-id=322 bgcolor=#E9E9E9
| 81322 ||  || — || April 5, 2000 || Socorro || LINEAR || — || align=right | 2.1 km || 
|-id=323 bgcolor=#E9E9E9
| 81323 ||  || — || April 5, 2000 || Socorro || LINEAR || — || align=right | 5.4 km || 
|-id=324 bgcolor=#E9E9E9
| 81324 ||  || — || April 5, 2000 || Socorro || LINEAR || — || align=right | 5.1 km || 
|-id=325 bgcolor=#fefefe
| 81325 ||  || — || April 5, 2000 || Socorro || LINEAR || NYS || align=right | 1.9 km || 
|-id=326 bgcolor=#E9E9E9
| 81326 ||  || — || April 5, 2000 || Socorro || LINEAR || — || align=right | 2.0 km || 
|-id=327 bgcolor=#E9E9E9
| 81327 ||  || — || April 5, 2000 || Socorro || LINEAR || — || align=right | 2.2 km || 
|-id=328 bgcolor=#E9E9E9
| 81328 ||  || — || April 5, 2000 || Socorro || LINEAR || GEF || align=right | 2.4 km || 
|-id=329 bgcolor=#E9E9E9
| 81329 ||  || — || April 5, 2000 || Socorro || LINEAR || — || align=right | 3.5 km || 
|-id=330 bgcolor=#E9E9E9
| 81330 ||  || — || April 5, 2000 || Socorro || LINEAR || — || align=right | 6.3 km || 
|-id=331 bgcolor=#E9E9E9
| 81331 ||  || — || April 5, 2000 || Socorro || LINEAR || — || align=right | 2.2 km || 
|-id=332 bgcolor=#E9E9E9
| 81332 ||  || — || April 5, 2000 || Socorro || LINEAR || — || align=right | 3.7 km || 
|-id=333 bgcolor=#E9E9E9
| 81333 ||  || — || April 5, 2000 || Socorro || LINEAR || HEN || align=right | 2.7 km || 
|-id=334 bgcolor=#E9E9E9
| 81334 ||  || — || April 5, 2000 || Socorro || LINEAR || — || align=right | 3.8 km || 
|-id=335 bgcolor=#E9E9E9
| 81335 ||  || — || April 5, 2000 || Socorro || LINEAR || — || align=right | 1.9 km || 
|-id=336 bgcolor=#E9E9E9
| 81336 ||  || — || April 5, 2000 || Socorro || LINEAR || — || align=right | 3.3 km || 
|-id=337 bgcolor=#E9E9E9
| 81337 ||  || — || April 5, 2000 || Socorro || LINEAR || SHF || align=right | 2.5 km || 
|-id=338 bgcolor=#d6d6d6
| 81338 ||  || — || April 5, 2000 || Socorro || LINEAR || — || align=right | 4.9 km || 
|-id=339 bgcolor=#E9E9E9
| 81339 ||  || — || April 5, 2000 || Socorro || LINEAR || — || align=right | 3.2 km || 
|-id=340 bgcolor=#E9E9E9
| 81340 ||  || — || April 5, 2000 || Socorro || LINEAR || — || align=right | 5.1 km || 
|-id=341 bgcolor=#E9E9E9
| 81341 ||  || — || April 5, 2000 || Socorro || LINEAR || ADE || align=right | 6.2 km || 
|-id=342 bgcolor=#E9E9E9
| 81342 ||  || — || April 5, 2000 || Socorro || LINEAR || EUN || align=right | 3.5 km || 
|-id=343 bgcolor=#E9E9E9
| 81343 ||  || — || April 5, 2000 || Socorro || LINEAR || — || align=right | 1.5 km || 
|-id=344 bgcolor=#E9E9E9
| 81344 ||  || — || April 5, 2000 || Socorro || LINEAR || — || align=right | 2.9 km || 
|-id=345 bgcolor=#E9E9E9
| 81345 ||  || — || April 5, 2000 || Socorro || LINEAR || — || align=right | 3.3 km || 
|-id=346 bgcolor=#E9E9E9
| 81346 ||  || — || April 5, 2000 || Socorro || LINEAR || — || align=right | 2.9 km || 
|-id=347 bgcolor=#fefefe
| 81347 ||  || — || April 5, 2000 || Socorro || LINEAR || NYS || align=right | 1.4 km || 
|-id=348 bgcolor=#E9E9E9
| 81348 ||  || — || April 5, 2000 || Socorro || LINEAR || PAD || align=right | 4.0 km || 
|-id=349 bgcolor=#fefefe
| 81349 ||  || — || April 5, 2000 || Socorro || LINEAR || — || align=right | 1.8 km || 
|-id=350 bgcolor=#E9E9E9
| 81350 ||  || — || April 5, 2000 || Socorro || LINEAR || — || align=right | 4.8 km || 
|-id=351 bgcolor=#E9E9E9
| 81351 ||  || — || April 5, 2000 || Socorro || LINEAR || — || align=right | 2.4 km || 
|-id=352 bgcolor=#E9E9E9
| 81352 ||  || — || April 5, 2000 || Socorro || LINEAR || — || align=right | 5.5 km || 
|-id=353 bgcolor=#E9E9E9
| 81353 ||  || — || April 5, 2000 || Socorro || LINEAR || — || align=right | 1.5 km || 
|-id=354 bgcolor=#E9E9E9
| 81354 ||  || — || April 5, 2000 || Socorro || LINEAR || PAD || align=right | 4.9 km || 
|-id=355 bgcolor=#E9E9E9
| 81355 ||  || — || April 5, 2000 || Socorro || LINEAR || — || align=right | 3.0 km || 
|-id=356 bgcolor=#E9E9E9
| 81356 ||  || — || April 5, 2000 || Socorro || LINEAR || — || align=right | 1.9 km || 
|-id=357 bgcolor=#E9E9E9
| 81357 ||  || — || April 5, 2000 || Socorro || LINEAR || WIT || align=right | 4.5 km || 
|-id=358 bgcolor=#E9E9E9
| 81358 ||  || — || April 5, 2000 || Socorro || LINEAR || — || align=right | 4.6 km || 
|-id=359 bgcolor=#E9E9E9
| 81359 ||  || — || April 5, 2000 || Socorro || LINEAR || EUN || align=right | 3.4 km || 
|-id=360 bgcolor=#E9E9E9
| 81360 ||  || — || April 5, 2000 || Socorro || LINEAR || GEF || align=right | 2.5 km || 
|-id=361 bgcolor=#d6d6d6
| 81361 ||  || — || April 5, 2000 || Socorro || LINEAR || — || align=right | 4.5 km || 
|-id=362 bgcolor=#E9E9E9
| 81362 ||  || — || April 5, 2000 || Socorro || LINEAR || — || align=right | 3.0 km || 
|-id=363 bgcolor=#E9E9E9
| 81363 ||  || — || April 5, 2000 || Socorro || LINEAR || — || align=right | 5.4 km || 
|-id=364 bgcolor=#E9E9E9
| 81364 ||  || — || April 5, 2000 || Socorro || LINEAR || WIT || align=right | 2.0 km || 
|-id=365 bgcolor=#d6d6d6
| 81365 ||  || — || April 5, 2000 || Socorro || LINEAR || — || align=right | 3.9 km || 
|-id=366 bgcolor=#E9E9E9
| 81366 ||  || — || April 5, 2000 || Socorro || LINEAR || — || align=right | 2.9 km || 
|-id=367 bgcolor=#E9E9E9
| 81367 ||  || — || April 5, 2000 || Socorro || LINEAR || — || align=right | 3.9 km || 
|-id=368 bgcolor=#E9E9E9
| 81368 ||  || — || April 5, 2000 || Socorro || LINEAR || AST || align=right | 4.7 km || 
|-id=369 bgcolor=#E9E9E9
| 81369 ||  || — || April 5, 2000 || Socorro || LINEAR || — || align=right | 4.2 km || 
|-id=370 bgcolor=#E9E9E9
| 81370 ||  || — || April 5, 2000 || Socorro || LINEAR || MAR || align=right | 2.5 km || 
|-id=371 bgcolor=#E9E9E9
| 81371 ||  || — || April 5, 2000 || Socorro || LINEAR || EUN || align=right | 3.0 km || 
|-id=372 bgcolor=#E9E9E9
| 81372 ||  || — || April 5, 2000 || Socorro || LINEAR || — || align=right | 2.9 km || 
|-id=373 bgcolor=#E9E9E9
| 81373 ||  || — || April 5, 2000 || Socorro || LINEAR || HNS || align=right | 2.4 km || 
|-id=374 bgcolor=#E9E9E9
| 81374 ||  || — || April 5, 2000 || Socorro || LINEAR || — || align=right | 2.9 km || 
|-id=375 bgcolor=#E9E9E9
| 81375 ||  || — || April 5, 2000 || Socorro || LINEAR || — || align=right | 2.4 km || 
|-id=376 bgcolor=#fefefe
| 81376 ||  || — || April 5, 2000 || Socorro || LINEAR || V || align=right | 1.8 km || 
|-id=377 bgcolor=#E9E9E9
| 81377 ||  || — || April 5, 2000 || Socorro || LINEAR || EUN || align=right | 4.0 km || 
|-id=378 bgcolor=#E9E9E9
| 81378 ||  || — || April 5, 2000 || Socorro || LINEAR || — || align=right | 3.4 km || 
|-id=379 bgcolor=#E9E9E9
| 81379 ||  || — || April 5, 2000 || Socorro || LINEAR || — || align=right | 3.7 km || 
|-id=380 bgcolor=#E9E9E9
| 81380 ||  || — || April 5, 2000 || Socorro || LINEAR || ADE || align=right | 5.1 km || 
|-id=381 bgcolor=#E9E9E9
| 81381 ||  || — || April 5, 2000 || Socorro || LINEAR || — || align=right | 2.3 km || 
|-id=382 bgcolor=#E9E9E9
| 81382 ||  || — || April 5, 2000 || Socorro || LINEAR || DOR || align=right | 6.9 km || 
|-id=383 bgcolor=#E9E9E9
| 81383 ||  || — || April 5, 2000 || Socorro || LINEAR || EUN || align=right | 3.6 km || 
|-id=384 bgcolor=#E9E9E9
| 81384 ||  || — || April 5, 2000 || Socorro || LINEAR || — || align=right | 2.0 km || 
|-id=385 bgcolor=#E9E9E9
| 81385 ||  || — || April 5, 2000 || Socorro || LINEAR || — || align=right | 2.6 km || 
|-id=386 bgcolor=#E9E9E9
| 81386 ||  || — || April 5, 2000 || Socorro || LINEAR || HNS || align=right | 3.0 km || 
|-id=387 bgcolor=#d6d6d6
| 81387 ||  || — || April 5, 2000 || Socorro || LINEAR || — || align=right | 6.0 km || 
|-id=388 bgcolor=#E9E9E9
| 81388 ||  || — || April 5, 2000 || Socorro || LINEAR || — || align=right | 3.1 km || 
|-id=389 bgcolor=#E9E9E9
| 81389 ||  || — || April 5, 2000 || Socorro || LINEAR || — || align=right | 3.3 km || 
|-id=390 bgcolor=#E9E9E9
| 81390 ||  || — || April 5, 2000 || Socorro || LINEAR || — || align=right | 2.8 km || 
|-id=391 bgcolor=#d6d6d6
| 81391 ||  || — || April 5, 2000 || Socorro || LINEAR || — || align=right | 5.3 km || 
|-id=392 bgcolor=#E9E9E9
| 81392 ||  || — || April 6, 2000 || Socorro || LINEAR || — || align=right | 3.2 km || 
|-id=393 bgcolor=#E9E9E9
| 81393 ||  || — || April 6, 2000 || Socorro || LINEAR || — || align=right | 2.0 km || 
|-id=394 bgcolor=#E9E9E9
| 81394 ||  || — || April 7, 2000 || Haleakala || NEAT || BAR || align=right | 2.2 km || 
|-id=395 bgcolor=#E9E9E9
| 81395 ||  || — || April 3, 2000 || Socorro || LINEAR || — || align=right | 5.0 km || 
|-id=396 bgcolor=#fefefe
| 81396 ||  || — || April 3, 2000 || Socorro || LINEAR || V || align=right | 1.5 km || 
|-id=397 bgcolor=#E9E9E9
| 81397 ||  || — || April 3, 2000 || Socorro || LINEAR || — || align=right | 2.9 km || 
|-id=398 bgcolor=#E9E9E9
| 81398 ||  || — || April 3, 2000 || Socorro || LINEAR || — || align=right | 4.7 km || 
|-id=399 bgcolor=#E9E9E9
| 81399 ||  || — || April 3, 2000 || Socorro || LINEAR || — || align=right | 3.4 km || 
|-id=400 bgcolor=#fefefe
| 81400 ||  || — || April 3, 2000 || Socorro || LINEAR || — || align=right | 2.6 km || 
|}

81401–81500 

|-bgcolor=#E9E9E9
| 81401 ||  || — || April 3, 2000 || Socorro || LINEAR || EUN || align=right | 2.2 km || 
|-id=402 bgcolor=#E9E9E9
| 81402 ||  || — || April 3, 2000 || Socorro || LINEAR || MAR || align=right | 2.7 km || 
|-id=403 bgcolor=#E9E9E9
| 81403 ||  || — || April 3, 2000 || Socorro || LINEAR || — || align=right | 4.2 km || 
|-id=404 bgcolor=#E9E9E9
| 81404 ||  || — || April 3, 2000 || Socorro || LINEAR || EUN || align=right | 2.2 km || 
|-id=405 bgcolor=#E9E9E9
| 81405 ||  || — || April 4, 2000 || Socorro || LINEAR || MAR || align=right | 3.3 km || 
|-id=406 bgcolor=#fefefe
| 81406 ||  || — || April 4, 2000 || Socorro || LINEAR || — || align=right | 5.8 km || 
|-id=407 bgcolor=#E9E9E9
| 81407 ||  || — || April 4, 2000 || Socorro || LINEAR || MAR || align=right | 2.8 km || 
|-id=408 bgcolor=#fefefe
| 81408 ||  || — || April 4, 2000 || Socorro || LINEAR || V || align=right | 2.0 km || 
|-id=409 bgcolor=#fefefe
| 81409 ||  || — || April 4, 2000 || Socorro || LINEAR || — || align=right | 8.4 km || 
|-id=410 bgcolor=#E9E9E9
| 81410 ||  || — || April 4, 2000 || Socorro || LINEAR || — || align=right | 3.8 km || 
|-id=411 bgcolor=#E9E9E9
| 81411 ||  || — || April 4, 2000 || Socorro || LINEAR || — || align=right | 3.3 km || 
|-id=412 bgcolor=#E9E9E9
| 81412 ||  || — || April 4, 2000 || Socorro || LINEAR || MAR || align=right | 3.0 km || 
|-id=413 bgcolor=#E9E9E9
| 81413 ||  || — || April 6, 2000 || Socorro || LINEAR || — || align=right | 3.6 km || 
|-id=414 bgcolor=#fefefe
| 81414 ||  || — || April 7, 2000 || Socorro || LINEAR || V || align=right | 1.8 km || 
|-id=415 bgcolor=#E9E9E9
| 81415 ||  || — || April 7, 2000 || Socorro || LINEAR || — || align=right | 2.2 km || 
|-id=416 bgcolor=#E9E9E9
| 81416 ||  || — || April 7, 2000 || Socorro || LINEAR || — || align=right | 3.4 km || 
|-id=417 bgcolor=#E9E9E9
| 81417 ||  || — || April 7, 2000 || Socorro || LINEAR || EUN || align=right | 2.2 km || 
|-id=418 bgcolor=#E9E9E9
| 81418 ||  || — || April 7, 2000 || Socorro || LINEAR || — || align=right | 3.4 km || 
|-id=419 bgcolor=#E9E9E9
| 81419 ||  || — || April 7, 2000 || Socorro || LINEAR || — || align=right | 3.1 km || 
|-id=420 bgcolor=#E9E9E9
| 81420 ||  || — || April 7, 2000 || Socorro || LINEAR || DOR || align=right | 5.6 km || 
|-id=421 bgcolor=#E9E9E9
| 81421 ||  || — || April 7, 2000 || Socorro || LINEAR || — || align=right | 4.1 km || 
|-id=422 bgcolor=#fefefe
| 81422 ||  || — || April 7, 2000 || Socorro || LINEAR || — || align=right | 1.9 km || 
|-id=423 bgcolor=#fefefe
| 81423 ||  || — || April 7, 2000 || Socorro || LINEAR || — || align=right | 2.2 km || 
|-id=424 bgcolor=#E9E9E9
| 81424 ||  || — || April 7, 2000 || Socorro || LINEAR || — || align=right | 2.9 km || 
|-id=425 bgcolor=#E9E9E9
| 81425 ||  || — || April 7, 2000 || Socorro || LINEAR || — || align=right | 2.1 km || 
|-id=426 bgcolor=#E9E9E9
| 81426 ||  || — || April 7, 2000 || Socorro || LINEAR || — || align=right | 3.7 km || 
|-id=427 bgcolor=#E9E9E9
| 81427 ||  || — || April 7, 2000 || Socorro || LINEAR || — || align=right | 3.3 km || 
|-id=428 bgcolor=#fefefe
| 81428 ||  || — || April 7, 2000 || Socorro || LINEAR || NYS || align=right | 1.7 km || 
|-id=429 bgcolor=#E9E9E9
| 81429 ||  || — || April 7, 2000 || Socorro || LINEAR || ADE || align=right | 8.1 km || 
|-id=430 bgcolor=#E9E9E9
| 81430 ||  || — || April 7, 2000 || Socorro || LINEAR || — || align=right | 3.3 km || 
|-id=431 bgcolor=#E9E9E9
| 81431 ||  || — || April 7, 2000 || Socorro || LINEAR || GEF || align=right | 3.2 km || 
|-id=432 bgcolor=#E9E9E9
| 81432 ||  || — || April 7, 2000 || Socorro || LINEAR || GEF || align=right | 3.2 km || 
|-id=433 bgcolor=#E9E9E9
| 81433 ||  || — || April 7, 2000 || Socorro || LINEAR || — || align=right | 5.1 km || 
|-id=434 bgcolor=#E9E9E9
| 81434 ||  || — || April 2, 2000 || Anderson Mesa || LONEOS || — || align=right | 2.8 km || 
|-id=435 bgcolor=#E9E9E9
| 81435 ||  || — || April 2, 2000 || Anderson Mesa || LONEOS || — || align=right | 2.9 km || 
|-id=436 bgcolor=#E9E9E9
| 81436 ||  || — || April 2, 2000 || Anderson Mesa || LONEOS || RAF || align=right | 1.9 km || 
|-id=437 bgcolor=#E9E9E9
| 81437 ||  || — || April 2, 2000 || Anderson Mesa || LONEOS || MAR || align=right | 1.8 km || 
|-id=438 bgcolor=#E9E9E9
| 81438 ||  || — || April 3, 2000 || Anderson Mesa || LONEOS || — || align=right | 6.2 km || 
|-id=439 bgcolor=#E9E9E9
| 81439 ||  || — || April 4, 2000 || Socorro || LINEAR || MAR || align=right | 2.0 km || 
|-id=440 bgcolor=#E9E9E9
| 81440 ||  || — || April 5, 2000 || Socorro || LINEAR || JUN || align=right | 4.1 km || 
|-id=441 bgcolor=#E9E9E9
| 81441 ||  || — || April 7, 2000 || Socorro || LINEAR || MRX || align=right | 2.5 km || 
|-id=442 bgcolor=#E9E9E9
| 81442 ||  || — || April 7, 2000 || Socorro || LINEAR || PAD || align=right | 5.7 km || 
|-id=443 bgcolor=#E9E9E9
| 81443 ||  || — || April 7, 2000 || Socorro || LINEAR || — || align=right | 2.5 km || 
|-id=444 bgcolor=#E9E9E9
| 81444 ||  || — || April 2, 2000 || Kitt Peak || Spacewatch || — || align=right | 1.8 km || 
|-id=445 bgcolor=#E9E9E9
| 81445 ||  || — || April 6, 2000 || Kitt Peak || Spacewatch || — || align=right | 3.1 km || 
|-id=446 bgcolor=#E9E9E9
| 81446 ||  || — || April 7, 2000 || Socorro || LINEAR || XIZ || align=right | 4.1 km || 
|-id=447 bgcolor=#E9E9E9
| 81447 ||  || — || April 7, 2000 || Socorro || LINEAR || — || align=right | 3.5 km || 
|-id=448 bgcolor=#fefefe
| 81448 ||  || — || April 7, 2000 || Socorro || LINEAR || — || align=right | 3.2 km || 
|-id=449 bgcolor=#E9E9E9
| 81449 ||  || — || April 7, 2000 || Socorro || LINEAR || — || align=right | 3.0 km || 
|-id=450 bgcolor=#E9E9E9
| 81450 ||  || — || April 7, 2000 || Socorro || LINEAR || — || align=right | 4.3 km || 
|-id=451 bgcolor=#E9E9E9
| 81451 ||  || — || April 7, 2000 || Socorro || LINEAR || — || align=right | 2.2 km || 
|-id=452 bgcolor=#E9E9E9
| 81452 ||  || — || April 7, 2000 || Socorro || LINEAR || — || align=right | 3.4 km || 
|-id=453 bgcolor=#E9E9E9
| 81453 ||  || — || April 7, 2000 || Socorro || LINEAR || — || align=right | 5.4 km || 
|-id=454 bgcolor=#E9E9E9
| 81454 ||  || — || April 7, 2000 || Socorro || LINEAR || — || align=right | 4.4 km || 
|-id=455 bgcolor=#E9E9E9
| 81455 ||  || — || April 6, 2000 || Kitt Peak || Spacewatch || BRU || align=right | 5.9 km || 
|-id=456 bgcolor=#E9E9E9
| 81456 ||  || — || April 5, 2000 || Kitt Peak || Spacewatch || — || align=right | 4.8 km || 
|-id=457 bgcolor=#E9E9E9
| 81457 ||  || — || April 5, 2000 || Kitt Peak || Spacewatch || — || align=right | 3.6 km || 
|-id=458 bgcolor=#E9E9E9
| 81458 ||  || — || April 7, 2000 || Kitt Peak || Spacewatch || — || align=right | 2.8 km || 
|-id=459 bgcolor=#d6d6d6
| 81459 ||  || — || April 10, 2000 || Kitt Peak || Spacewatch || — || align=right | 5.3 km || 
|-id=460 bgcolor=#E9E9E9
| 81460 ||  || — || April 7, 2000 || Socorro || LINEAR || — || align=right | 2.5 km || 
|-id=461 bgcolor=#E9E9E9
| 81461 ||  || — || April 8, 2000 || Socorro || LINEAR || — || align=right | 3.6 km || 
|-id=462 bgcolor=#E9E9E9
| 81462 ||  || — || April 8, 2000 || Socorro || LINEAR || DOR || align=right | 6.0 km || 
|-id=463 bgcolor=#E9E9E9
| 81463 ||  || — || April 8, 2000 || Socorro || LINEAR || — || align=right | 4.3 km || 
|-id=464 bgcolor=#E9E9E9
| 81464 ||  || — || April 8, 2000 || Socorro || LINEAR || — || align=right | 4.0 km || 
|-id=465 bgcolor=#E9E9E9
| 81465 ||  || — || April 12, 2000 || Socorro || LINEAR || EUN || align=right | 3.9 km || 
|-id=466 bgcolor=#E9E9E9
| 81466 ||  || — || April 12, 2000 || Socorro || LINEAR || — || align=right | 2.7 km || 
|-id=467 bgcolor=#E9E9E9
| 81467 ||  || — || April 12, 2000 || Socorro || LINEAR || EUN || align=right | 3.1 km || 
|-id=468 bgcolor=#E9E9E9
| 81468 ||  || — || April 4, 2000 || Anderson Mesa || LONEOS || MAR || align=right | 3.3 km || 
|-id=469 bgcolor=#E9E9E9
| 81469 ||  || — || April 4, 2000 || Anderson Mesa || LONEOS || MAR || align=right | 3.1 km || 
|-id=470 bgcolor=#E9E9E9
| 81470 ||  || — || April 4, 2000 || Anderson Mesa || LONEOS || — || align=right | 4.1 km || 
|-id=471 bgcolor=#E9E9E9
| 81471 ||  || — || April 4, 2000 || Anderson Mesa || LONEOS || INO || align=right | 4.6 km || 
|-id=472 bgcolor=#E9E9E9
| 81472 ||  || — || April 4, 2000 || Anderson Mesa || LONEOS || — || align=right | 2.7 km || 
|-id=473 bgcolor=#E9E9E9
| 81473 ||  || — || April 4, 2000 || Anderson Mesa || LONEOS || — || align=right | 2.4 km || 
|-id=474 bgcolor=#E9E9E9
| 81474 ||  || — || April 6, 2000 || Anderson Mesa || LONEOS || — || align=right | 1.9 km || 
|-id=475 bgcolor=#E9E9E9
| 81475 ||  || — || April 7, 2000 || Anderson Mesa || LONEOS || ADE || align=right | 5.0 km || 
|-id=476 bgcolor=#fefefe
| 81476 ||  || — || April 7, 2000 || Anderson Mesa || LONEOS || — || align=right | 2.1 km || 
|-id=477 bgcolor=#E9E9E9
| 81477 ||  || — || April 7, 2000 || Anderson Mesa || LONEOS || — || align=right | 2.8 km || 
|-id=478 bgcolor=#E9E9E9
| 81478 ||  || — || April 7, 2000 || Anderson Mesa || LONEOS || — || align=right | 4.6 km || 
|-id=479 bgcolor=#E9E9E9
| 81479 ||  || — || April 7, 2000 || Anderson Mesa || LONEOS || — || align=right | 3.2 km || 
|-id=480 bgcolor=#E9E9E9
| 81480 ||  || — || April 7, 2000 || Anderson Mesa || LONEOS || — || align=right | 3.2 km || 
|-id=481 bgcolor=#E9E9E9
| 81481 ||  || — || April 12, 2000 || Kitt Peak || Spacewatch || — || align=right | 2.3 km || 
|-id=482 bgcolor=#E9E9E9
| 81482 ||  || — || April 5, 2000 || Socorro || LINEAR || — || align=right | 5.5 km || 
|-id=483 bgcolor=#E9E9E9
| 81483 ||  || — || April 6, 2000 || Anderson Mesa || LONEOS || JUL || align=right | 2.1 km || 
|-id=484 bgcolor=#E9E9E9
| 81484 ||  || — || April 6, 2000 || Anderson Mesa || LONEOS || — || align=right | 3.6 km || 
|-id=485 bgcolor=#E9E9E9
| 81485 ||  || — || April 6, 2000 || Anderson Mesa || LONEOS || — || align=right | 7.5 km || 
|-id=486 bgcolor=#E9E9E9
| 81486 ||  || — || April 6, 2000 || Anderson Mesa || LONEOS || — || align=right | 4.0 km || 
|-id=487 bgcolor=#E9E9E9
| 81487 ||  || — || April 6, 2000 || Anderson Mesa || LONEOS || — || align=right | 6.9 km || 
|-id=488 bgcolor=#E9E9E9
| 81488 ||  || — || April 6, 2000 || Anderson Mesa || LONEOS || — || align=right | 4.3 km || 
|-id=489 bgcolor=#E9E9E9
| 81489 ||  || — || April 6, 2000 || Socorro || LINEAR || HEN || align=right | 2.1 km || 
|-id=490 bgcolor=#E9E9E9
| 81490 ||  || — || April 6, 2000 || Anderson Mesa || LONEOS || — || align=right | 1.8 km || 
|-id=491 bgcolor=#E9E9E9
| 81491 ||  || — || April 6, 2000 || Anderson Mesa || LONEOS || — || align=right | 3.9 km || 
|-id=492 bgcolor=#E9E9E9
| 81492 ||  || — || April 7, 2000 || Socorro || LINEAR || — || align=right | 3.5 km || 
|-id=493 bgcolor=#E9E9E9
| 81493 ||  || — || April 7, 2000 || Anderson Mesa || LONEOS || — || align=right | 1.9 km || 
|-id=494 bgcolor=#fefefe
| 81494 ||  || — || April 7, 2000 || Socorro || LINEAR || — || align=right | 2.6 km || 
|-id=495 bgcolor=#E9E9E9
| 81495 ||  || — || April 7, 2000 || Anderson Mesa || LONEOS || EUN || align=right | 2.1 km || 
|-id=496 bgcolor=#E9E9E9
| 81496 ||  || — || April 7, 2000 || Socorro || LINEAR || — || align=right | 2.7 km || 
|-id=497 bgcolor=#fefefe
| 81497 ||  || — || April 7, 2000 || Socorro || LINEAR || V || align=right | 2.0 km || 
|-id=498 bgcolor=#fefefe
| 81498 ||  || — || April 7, 2000 || Socorro || LINEAR || — || align=right | 3.1 km || 
|-id=499 bgcolor=#E9E9E9
| 81499 ||  || — || April 7, 2000 || Socorro || LINEAR || — || align=right | 5.4 km || 
|-id=500 bgcolor=#E9E9E9
| 81500 ||  || — || April 7, 2000 || Socorro || LINEAR || NEM || align=right | 5.7 km || 
|}

81501–81600 

|-bgcolor=#E9E9E9
| 81501 ||  || — || April 8, 2000 || Socorro || LINEAR || — || align=right | 5.7 km || 
|-id=502 bgcolor=#E9E9E9
| 81502 ||  || — || April 8, 2000 || Socorro || LINEAR || — || align=right | 2.3 km || 
|-id=503 bgcolor=#d6d6d6
| 81503 ||  || — || April 9, 2000 || Anderson Mesa || LONEOS || — || align=right | 3.6 km || 
|-id=504 bgcolor=#E9E9E9
| 81504 ||  || — || April 9, 2000 || Anderson Mesa || LONEOS || — || align=right | 3.1 km || 
|-id=505 bgcolor=#E9E9E9
| 81505 ||  || — || April 12, 2000 || Socorro || LINEAR || GER || align=right | 5.3 km || 
|-id=506 bgcolor=#E9E9E9
| 81506 ||  || — || April 12, 2000 || Socorro || LINEAR || — || align=right | 6.1 km || 
|-id=507 bgcolor=#E9E9E9
| 81507 ||  || — || April 5, 2000 || Socorro || LINEAR || — || align=right | 3.9 km || 
|-id=508 bgcolor=#E9E9E9
| 81508 ||  || — || April 5, 2000 || Socorro || LINEAR || AST || align=right | 3.6 km || 
|-id=509 bgcolor=#E9E9E9
| 81509 ||  || — || April 4, 2000 || Anderson Mesa || LONEOS || — || align=right | 3.7 km || 
|-id=510 bgcolor=#E9E9E9
| 81510 ||  || — || April 4, 2000 || Anderson Mesa || LONEOS || HNS || align=right | 3.1 km || 
|-id=511 bgcolor=#E9E9E9
| 81511 ||  || — || April 2, 2000 || Anderson Mesa || LONEOS || — || align=right | 2.7 km || 
|-id=512 bgcolor=#E9E9E9
| 81512 ||  || — || April 5, 2000 || Anderson Mesa || LONEOS || — || align=right | 3.4 km || 
|-id=513 bgcolor=#fefefe
| 81513 ||  || — || April 5, 2000 || Anderson Mesa || LONEOS || NYS || align=right | 1.5 km || 
|-id=514 bgcolor=#E9E9E9
| 81514 ||  || — || April 2, 2000 || Anderson Mesa || LONEOS || — || align=right | 5.7 km || 
|-id=515 bgcolor=#E9E9E9
| 81515 ||  || — || April 2, 2000 || Anderson Mesa || LONEOS || — || align=right | 3.6 km || 
|-id=516 bgcolor=#E9E9E9
| 81516 ||  || — || April 4, 2000 || Socorro || LINEAR || JUN || align=right | 1.8 km || 
|-id=517 bgcolor=#E9E9E9
| 81517 ||  || — || April 5, 2000 || Socorro || LINEAR || — || align=right | 5.0 km || 
|-id=518 bgcolor=#E9E9E9
| 81518 ||  || — || April 25, 2000 || Kitt Peak || Spacewatch || — || align=right | 2.4 km || 
|-id=519 bgcolor=#E9E9E9
| 81519 ||  || — || April 24, 2000 || Kitt Peak || Spacewatch || — || align=right | 2.4 km || 
|-id=520 bgcolor=#E9E9E9
| 81520 ||  || — || April 24, 2000 || Kitt Peak || Spacewatch || — || align=right | 5.3 km || 
|-id=521 bgcolor=#E9E9E9
| 81521 ||  || — || April 28, 2000 || Kitt Peak || Spacewatch || AGN || align=right | 2.3 km || 
|-id=522 bgcolor=#E9E9E9
| 81522 ||  || — || April 27, 2000 || Socorro || LINEAR || HOF || align=right | 6.8 km || 
|-id=523 bgcolor=#E9E9E9
| 81523 ||  || — || April 27, 2000 || Socorro || LINEAR || — || align=right | 2.5 km || 
|-id=524 bgcolor=#E9E9E9
| 81524 ||  || — || April 27, 2000 || Socorro || LINEAR || — || align=right | 3.8 km || 
|-id=525 bgcolor=#E9E9E9
| 81525 ||  || — || April 27, 2000 || Socorro || LINEAR || — || align=right | 4.8 km || 
|-id=526 bgcolor=#E9E9E9
| 81526 ||  || — || April 27, 2000 || Socorro || LINEAR || — || align=right | 2.9 km || 
|-id=527 bgcolor=#E9E9E9
| 81527 ||  || — || April 27, 2000 || Socorro || LINEAR || — || align=right | 2.8 km || 
|-id=528 bgcolor=#E9E9E9
| 81528 ||  || — || April 27, 2000 || Socorro || LINEAR || — || align=right | 2.4 km || 
|-id=529 bgcolor=#E9E9E9
| 81529 ||  || — || April 28, 2000 || Socorro || LINEAR || — || align=right | 2.7 km || 
|-id=530 bgcolor=#E9E9E9
| 81530 ||  || — || April 28, 2000 || Socorro || LINEAR || — || align=right | 3.5 km || 
|-id=531 bgcolor=#E9E9E9
| 81531 ||  || — || April 29, 2000 || Baton Rouge || W. R. Cooney Jr., M. Hess || — || align=right | 5.1 km || 
|-id=532 bgcolor=#E9E9E9
| 81532 ||  || — || April 29, 2000 || Socorro || LINEAR || — || align=right | 3.2 km || 
|-id=533 bgcolor=#E9E9E9
| 81533 ||  || — || April 27, 2000 || Socorro || LINEAR || — || align=right | 2.2 km || 
|-id=534 bgcolor=#E9E9E9
| 81534 ||  || — || April 27, 2000 || Socorro || LINEAR || — || align=right | 2.4 km || 
|-id=535 bgcolor=#E9E9E9
| 81535 ||  || — || April 29, 2000 || Socorro || LINEAR || — || align=right | 4.7 km || 
|-id=536 bgcolor=#fefefe
| 81536 ||  || — || April 24, 2000 || Kitt Peak || Spacewatch || ERI || align=right | 2.2 km || 
|-id=537 bgcolor=#E9E9E9
| 81537 ||  || — || April 24, 2000 || Kitt Peak || Spacewatch || ADE || align=right | 6.5 km || 
|-id=538 bgcolor=#E9E9E9
| 81538 ||  || — || April 24, 2000 || Kitt Peak || Spacewatch || WIT || align=right | 2.2 km || 
|-id=539 bgcolor=#E9E9E9
| 81539 ||  || — || April 25, 2000 || Kitt Peak || Spacewatch || — || align=right | 2.0 km || 
|-id=540 bgcolor=#E9E9E9
| 81540 ||  || — || April 25, 2000 || Kitt Peak || Spacewatch || — || align=right | 4.9 km || 
|-id=541 bgcolor=#E9E9E9
| 81541 ||  || — || April 27, 2000 || Socorro || LINEAR || — || align=right | 2.6 km || 
|-id=542 bgcolor=#E9E9E9
| 81542 ||  || — || April 27, 2000 || Socorro || LINEAR || — || align=right | 3.5 km || 
|-id=543 bgcolor=#E9E9E9
| 81543 ||  || — || April 28, 2000 || Socorro || LINEAR || DOR || align=right | 8.2 km || 
|-id=544 bgcolor=#E9E9E9
| 81544 ||  || — || April 29, 2000 || Socorro || LINEAR || — || align=right | 3.4 km || 
|-id=545 bgcolor=#E9E9E9
| 81545 ||  || — || April 29, 2000 || Socorro || LINEAR || — || align=right | 2.2 km || 
|-id=546 bgcolor=#E9E9E9
| 81546 ||  || — || April 29, 2000 || Socorro || LINEAR || — || align=right | 2.7 km || 
|-id=547 bgcolor=#E9E9E9
| 81547 ||  || — || April 30, 2000 || Socorro || LINEAR || — || align=right | 2.6 km || 
|-id=548 bgcolor=#E9E9E9
| 81548 ||  || — || April 30, 2000 || Socorro || LINEAR || — || align=right | 2.5 km || 
|-id=549 bgcolor=#E9E9E9
| 81549 ||  || — || April 30, 2000 || Socorro || LINEAR || — || align=right | 3.9 km || 
|-id=550 bgcolor=#E9E9E9
| 81550 ||  || — || April 26, 2000 || Višnjan Observatory || K. Korlević || IAN || align=right | 4.1 km || 
|-id=551 bgcolor=#E9E9E9
| 81551 ||  || — || April 24, 2000 || Anderson Mesa || LONEOS || — || align=right | 2.5 km || 
|-id=552 bgcolor=#d6d6d6
| 81552 ||  || — || April 24, 2000 || Anderson Mesa || LONEOS || KOR || align=right | 2.8 km || 
|-id=553 bgcolor=#E9E9E9
| 81553 ||  || — || April 24, 2000 || Anderson Mesa || LONEOS || — || align=right | 2.7 km || 
|-id=554 bgcolor=#E9E9E9
| 81554 ||  || — || April 24, 2000 || Anderson Mesa || LONEOS || — || align=right | 2.4 km || 
|-id=555 bgcolor=#E9E9E9
| 81555 ||  || — || April 24, 2000 || Anderson Mesa || LONEOS || — || align=right | 2.7 km || 
|-id=556 bgcolor=#E9E9E9
| 81556 ||  || — || April 24, 2000 || Anderson Mesa || LONEOS || AGN || align=right | 2.7 km || 
|-id=557 bgcolor=#E9E9E9
| 81557 ||  || — || April 29, 2000 || Socorro || LINEAR || HNS || align=right | 3.3 km || 
|-id=558 bgcolor=#E9E9E9
| 81558 ||  || — || April 28, 2000 || Socorro || LINEAR || — || align=right | 3.9 km || 
|-id=559 bgcolor=#E9E9E9
| 81559 ||  || — || April 28, 2000 || Socorro || LINEAR || — || align=right | 3.8 km || 
|-id=560 bgcolor=#E9E9E9
| 81560 ||  || — || April 28, 2000 || Socorro || LINEAR || GER || align=right | 3.0 km || 
|-id=561 bgcolor=#E9E9E9
| 81561 ||  || — || April 28, 2000 || Socorro || LINEAR || — || align=right | 5.4 km || 
|-id=562 bgcolor=#E9E9E9
| 81562 ||  || — || April 28, 2000 || Socorro || LINEAR || — || align=right | 3.0 km || 
|-id=563 bgcolor=#E9E9E9
| 81563 ||  || — || April 28, 2000 || Socorro || LINEAR || — || align=right | 2.8 km || 
|-id=564 bgcolor=#E9E9E9
| 81564 ||  || — || April 29, 2000 || Socorro || LINEAR || — || align=right | 5.2 km || 
|-id=565 bgcolor=#d6d6d6
| 81565 ||  || — || April 29, 2000 || Socorro || LINEAR || KOR || align=right | 3.4 km || 
|-id=566 bgcolor=#E9E9E9
| 81566 ||  || — || April 29, 2000 || Socorro || LINEAR || HNS || align=right | 3.5 km || 
|-id=567 bgcolor=#E9E9E9
| 81567 ||  || — || April 29, 2000 || Socorro || LINEAR || MAR || align=right | 2.4 km || 
|-id=568 bgcolor=#E9E9E9
| 81568 ||  || — || April 25, 2000 || Anderson Mesa || LONEOS || — || align=right | 2.6 km || 
|-id=569 bgcolor=#E9E9E9
| 81569 ||  || — || April 27, 2000 || Socorro || LINEAR || EUN || align=right | 2.7 km || 
|-id=570 bgcolor=#E9E9E9
| 81570 ||  || — || April 28, 2000 || Socorro || LINEAR || MAR || align=right | 3.0 km || 
|-id=571 bgcolor=#E9E9E9
| 81571 ||  || — || April 28, 2000 || Socorro || LINEAR || — || align=right | 4.2 km || 
|-id=572 bgcolor=#E9E9E9
| 81572 ||  || — || April 28, 2000 || Socorro || LINEAR || EUN || align=right | 3.1 km || 
|-id=573 bgcolor=#E9E9E9
| 81573 ||  || — || April 29, 2000 || Socorro || LINEAR || EUN || align=right | 2.4 km || 
|-id=574 bgcolor=#E9E9E9
| 81574 ||  || — || April 30, 2000 || Kitt Peak || Spacewatch || — || align=right | 3.4 km || 
|-id=575 bgcolor=#d6d6d6
| 81575 ||  || — || April 30, 2000 || Kitt Peak || Spacewatch || — || align=right | 7.9 km || 
|-id=576 bgcolor=#d6d6d6
| 81576 ||  || — || April 28, 2000 || Socorro || LINEAR || — || align=right | 4.4 km || 
|-id=577 bgcolor=#E9E9E9
| 81577 ||  || — || April 28, 2000 || Socorro || LINEAR || MAR || align=right | 2.8 km || 
|-id=578 bgcolor=#E9E9E9
| 81578 ||  || — || April 29, 2000 || Socorro || LINEAR || EUN || align=right | 6.0 km || 
|-id=579 bgcolor=#E9E9E9
| 81579 ||  || — || April 29, 2000 || Socorro || LINEAR || — || align=right | 3.5 km || 
|-id=580 bgcolor=#E9E9E9
| 81580 ||  || — || April 26, 2000 || Anderson Mesa || LONEOS || EUN || align=right | 2.3 km || 
|-id=581 bgcolor=#E9E9E9
| 81581 ||  || — || April 26, 2000 || Anderson Mesa || LONEOS || WIT || align=right | 2.3 km || 
|-id=582 bgcolor=#E9E9E9
| 81582 ||  || — || April 27, 2000 || Socorro || LINEAR || HNS || align=right | 2.5 km || 
|-id=583 bgcolor=#E9E9E9
| 81583 ||  || — || April 29, 2000 || Socorro || LINEAR || — || align=right | 3.4 km || 
|-id=584 bgcolor=#E9E9E9
| 81584 ||  || — || April 29, 2000 || Socorro || LINEAR || — || align=right | 2.4 km || 
|-id=585 bgcolor=#E9E9E9
| 81585 ||  || — || April 29, 2000 || Socorro || LINEAR || — || align=right | 6.8 km || 
|-id=586 bgcolor=#E9E9E9
| 81586 ||  || — || April 29, 2000 || Socorro || LINEAR || — || align=right | 7.3 km || 
|-id=587 bgcolor=#d6d6d6
| 81587 ||  || — || April 29, 2000 || Socorro || LINEAR || KOR || align=right | 2.7 km || 
|-id=588 bgcolor=#E9E9E9
| 81588 ||  || — || April 29, 2000 || Socorro || LINEAR || — || align=right | 3.4 km || 
|-id=589 bgcolor=#d6d6d6
| 81589 ||  || — || April 29, 2000 || Socorro || LINEAR || THM || align=right | 6.5 km || 
|-id=590 bgcolor=#E9E9E9
| 81590 ||  || — || April 29, 2000 || Socorro || LINEAR || — || align=right | 3.3 km || 
|-id=591 bgcolor=#E9E9E9
| 81591 ||  || — || April 29, 2000 || Socorro || LINEAR || — || align=right | 2.7 km || 
|-id=592 bgcolor=#E9E9E9
| 81592 ||  || — || April 29, 2000 || Socorro || LINEAR || — || align=right | 4.1 km || 
|-id=593 bgcolor=#E9E9E9
| 81593 ||  || — || April 29, 2000 || Socorro || LINEAR || — || align=right | 2.7 km || 
|-id=594 bgcolor=#E9E9E9
| 81594 ||  || — || April 29, 2000 || Socorro || LINEAR || — || align=right | 2.4 km || 
|-id=595 bgcolor=#d6d6d6
| 81595 ||  || — || April 29, 2000 || Socorro || LINEAR || ALA || align=right | 6.0 km || 
|-id=596 bgcolor=#E9E9E9
| 81596 ||  || — || April 29, 2000 || Socorro || LINEAR || — || align=right | 6.0 km || 
|-id=597 bgcolor=#E9E9E9
| 81597 ||  || — || April 29, 2000 || Socorro || LINEAR || — || align=right | 3.7 km || 
|-id=598 bgcolor=#E9E9E9
| 81598 ||  || — || April 30, 2000 || Socorro || LINEAR || — || align=right | 2.0 km || 
|-id=599 bgcolor=#E9E9E9
| 81599 ||  || — || April 24, 2000 || Anderson Mesa || LONEOS || — || align=right | 2.1 km || 
|-id=600 bgcolor=#E9E9E9
| 81600 ||  || — || April 24, 2000 || Anderson Mesa || LONEOS || — || align=right | 4.6 km || 
|}

81601–81700 

|-bgcolor=#E9E9E9
| 81601 ||  || — || April 25, 2000 || Anderson Mesa || LONEOS || — || align=right | 2.0 km || 
|-id=602 bgcolor=#E9E9E9
| 81602 ||  || — || April 25, 2000 || Anderson Mesa || LONEOS || — || align=right | 3.1 km || 
|-id=603 bgcolor=#E9E9E9
| 81603 ||  || — || April 25, 2000 || Anderson Mesa || LONEOS || — || align=right | 3.5 km || 
|-id=604 bgcolor=#E9E9E9
| 81604 ||  || — || April 26, 2000 || Anderson Mesa || LONEOS || — || align=right | 4.5 km || 
|-id=605 bgcolor=#E9E9E9
| 81605 ||  || — || April 26, 2000 || Anderson Mesa || LONEOS || — || align=right | 4.9 km || 
|-id=606 bgcolor=#E9E9E9
| 81606 ||  || — || April 26, 2000 || Anderson Mesa || LONEOS || — || align=right | 2.4 km || 
|-id=607 bgcolor=#E9E9E9
| 81607 ||  || — || April 26, 2000 || Anderson Mesa || LONEOS || — || align=right | 4.0 km || 
|-id=608 bgcolor=#E9E9E9
| 81608 ||  || — || April 26, 2000 || Anderson Mesa || LONEOS || — || align=right | 2.1 km || 
|-id=609 bgcolor=#E9E9E9
| 81609 ||  || — || April 26, 2000 || Anderson Mesa || LONEOS || HOF || align=right | 7.1 km || 
|-id=610 bgcolor=#E9E9E9
| 81610 ||  || — || April 26, 2000 || Anderson Mesa || LONEOS || — || align=right | 2.5 km || 
|-id=611 bgcolor=#E9E9E9
| 81611 ||  || — || April 26, 2000 || Anderson Mesa || LONEOS || GEF || align=right | 4.2 km || 
|-id=612 bgcolor=#E9E9E9
| 81612 ||  || — || April 27, 2000 || Kitt Peak || Spacewatch || HEN || align=right | 2.9 km || 
|-id=613 bgcolor=#E9E9E9
| 81613 ||  || — || April 24, 2000 || Anderson Mesa || LONEOS || AGN || align=right | 2.8 km || 
|-id=614 bgcolor=#d6d6d6
| 81614 ||  || — || April 26, 2000 || Anderson Mesa || LONEOS || FIR || align=right | 7.9 km || 
|-id=615 bgcolor=#E9E9E9
| 81615 ||  || — || April 26, 2000 || Anderson Mesa || LONEOS || — || align=right | 3.4 km || 
|-id=616 bgcolor=#d6d6d6
| 81616 ||  || — || April 26, 2000 || Anderson Mesa || LONEOS || — || align=right | 8.5 km || 
|-id=617 bgcolor=#E9E9E9
| 81617 ||  || — || April 26, 2000 || Anderson Mesa || LONEOS || — || align=right | 3.3 km || 
|-id=618 bgcolor=#E9E9E9
| 81618 ||  || — || April 25, 2000 || Anderson Mesa || LONEOS || — || align=right | 3.2 km || 
|-id=619 bgcolor=#fefefe
| 81619 ||  || — || April 27, 2000 || Anderson Mesa || LONEOS || — || align=right | 3.5 km || 
|-id=620 bgcolor=#E9E9E9
| 81620 ||  || — || April 27, 2000 || Anderson Mesa || LONEOS || — || align=right | 5.9 km || 
|-id=621 bgcolor=#E9E9E9
| 81621 ||  || — || April 27, 2000 || Anderson Mesa || LONEOS || INO || align=right | 1.9 km || 
|-id=622 bgcolor=#E9E9E9
| 81622 ||  || — || April 27, 2000 || Anderson Mesa || LONEOS || — || align=right | 2.3 km || 
|-id=623 bgcolor=#E9E9E9
| 81623 ||  || — || April 27, 2000 || Anderson Mesa || LONEOS || — || align=right | 4.1 km || 
|-id=624 bgcolor=#d6d6d6
| 81624 ||  || — || April 27, 2000 || Socorro || LINEAR || EOS || align=right | 4.0 km || 
|-id=625 bgcolor=#d6d6d6
| 81625 ||  || — || April 27, 2000 || Socorro || LINEAR || — || align=right | 9.8 km || 
|-id=626 bgcolor=#E9E9E9
| 81626 ||  || — || April 27, 2000 || Socorro || LINEAR || — || align=right | 3.3 km || 
|-id=627 bgcolor=#d6d6d6
| 81627 ||  || — || April 27, 2000 || Socorro || LINEAR || EOS || align=right | 5.0 km || 
|-id=628 bgcolor=#E9E9E9
| 81628 ||  || — || April 27, 2000 || Socorro || LINEAR || DOR || align=right | 6.7 km || 
|-id=629 bgcolor=#E9E9E9
| 81629 ||  || — || April 27, 2000 || Socorro || LINEAR || — || align=right | 3.5 km || 
|-id=630 bgcolor=#E9E9E9
| 81630 ||  || — || April 27, 2000 || Socorro || LINEAR || — || align=right | 2.7 km || 
|-id=631 bgcolor=#E9E9E9
| 81631 ||  || — || April 27, 2000 || Socorro || LINEAR || — || align=right | 5.2 km || 
|-id=632 bgcolor=#E9E9E9
| 81632 ||  || — || April 27, 2000 || Socorro || LINEAR || — || align=right | 3.1 km || 
|-id=633 bgcolor=#E9E9E9
| 81633 ||  || — || April 28, 2000 || Anderson Mesa || LONEOS || — || align=right | 3.2 km || 
|-id=634 bgcolor=#E9E9E9
| 81634 ||  || — || April 28, 2000 || Anderson Mesa || LONEOS || — || align=right | 3.6 km || 
|-id=635 bgcolor=#E9E9E9
| 81635 ||  || — || April 28, 2000 || Anderson Mesa || LONEOS || — || align=right | 6.5 km || 
|-id=636 bgcolor=#E9E9E9
| 81636 ||  || — || April 28, 2000 || Anderson Mesa || LONEOS || HNS || align=right | 2.1 km || 
|-id=637 bgcolor=#E9E9E9
| 81637 ||  || — || April 28, 2000 || Anderson Mesa || LONEOS || — || align=right | 2.6 km || 
|-id=638 bgcolor=#fefefe
| 81638 ||  || — || April 28, 2000 || Anderson Mesa || LONEOS || — || align=right | 2.8 km || 
|-id=639 bgcolor=#E9E9E9
| 81639 ||  || — || April 28, 2000 || Anderson Mesa || LONEOS || EUN || align=right | 4.7 km || 
|-id=640 bgcolor=#E9E9E9
| 81640 ||  || — || April 28, 2000 || Anderson Mesa || LONEOS || — || align=right | 3.5 km || 
|-id=641 bgcolor=#E9E9E9
| 81641 ||  || — || April 28, 2000 || Anderson Mesa || LONEOS || EUN || align=right | 3.4 km || 
|-id=642 bgcolor=#E9E9E9
| 81642 ||  || — || April 28, 2000 || Anderson Mesa || LONEOS || EUN || align=right | 3.0 km || 
|-id=643 bgcolor=#d6d6d6
| 81643 ||  || — || April 28, 2000 || Anderson Mesa || LONEOS || — || align=right | 7.5 km || 
|-id=644 bgcolor=#d6d6d6
| 81644 ||  || — || April 28, 2000 || Anderson Mesa || LONEOS || — || align=right | 8.7 km || 
|-id=645 bgcolor=#d6d6d6
| 81645 ||  || — || April 29, 2000 || Socorro || LINEAR || KOR || align=right | 3.7 km || 
|-id=646 bgcolor=#E9E9E9
| 81646 ||  || — || April 29, 2000 || Socorro || LINEAR || — || align=right | 4.0 km || 
|-id=647 bgcolor=#E9E9E9
| 81647 ||  || — || April 30, 2000 || Anderson Mesa || LONEOS || — || align=right | 3.3 km || 
|-id=648 bgcolor=#E9E9E9
| 81648 ||  || — || April 30, 2000 || Anderson Mesa || LONEOS || — || align=right | 3.5 km || 
|-id=649 bgcolor=#E9E9E9
| 81649 ||  || — || April 30, 2000 || Anderson Mesa || LONEOS || — || align=right | 4.1 km || 
|-id=650 bgcolor=#fefefe
| 81650 ||  || — || April 30, 2000 || Socorro || LINEAR || PHO || align=right | 2.9 km || 
|-id=651 bgcolor=#E9E9E9
| 81651 ||  || — || April 30, 2000 || Haleakala || NEAT || — || align=right | 3.4 km || 
|-id=652 bgcolor=#E9E9E9
| 81652 ||  || — || April 30, 2000 || Haleakala || NEAT || — || align=right | 4.4 km || 
|-id=653 bgcolor=#E9E9E9
| 81653 ||  || — || April 30, 2000 || Anderson Mesa || LONEOS || — || align=right | 2.4 km || 
|-id=654 bgcolor=#E9E9E9
| 81654 ||  || — || April 30, 2000 || Anderson Mesa || LONEOS || — || align=right | 5.0 km || 
|-id=655 bgcolor=#d6d6d6
| 81655 ||  || — || April 30, 2000 || Anderson Mesa || LONEOS || EOS || align=right | 5.0 km || 
|-id=656 bgcolor=#E9E9E9
| 81656 ||  || — || April 30, 2000 || Anderson Mesa || LONEOS || HOF || align=right | 5.6 km || 
|-id=657 bgcolor=#E9E9E9
| 81657 ||  || — || April 30, 2000 || Kitt Peak || Spacewatch || MAR || align=right | 2.3 km || 
|-id=658 bgcolor=#E9E9E9
| 81658 ||  || — || April 27, 2000 || Socorro || LINEAR || — || align=right | 2.4 km || 
|-id=659 bgcolor=#E9E9E9
| 81659 ||  || — || April 27, 2000 || Socorro || LINEAR || — || align=right | 2.1 km || 
|-id=660 bgcolor=#E9E9E9
| 81660 ||  || — || April 28, 2000 || Socorro || LINEAR || GEF || align=right | 2.7 km || 
|-id=661 bgcolor=#E9E9E9
| 81661 ||  || — || April 29, 2000 || Socorro || LINEAR || NEM || align=right | 5.7 km || 
|-id=662 bgcolor=#E9E9E9
| 81662 ||  || — || April 29, 2000 || Socorro || LINEAR || — || align=right | 2.3 km || 
|-id=663 bgcolor=#E9E9E9
| 81663 ||  || — || April 29, 2000 || Socorro || LINEAR || — || align=right | 4.9 km || 
|-id=664 bgcolor=#E9E9E9
| 81664 ||  || — || April 29, 2000 || Socorro || LINEAR || — || align=right | 3.0 km || 
|-id=665 bgcolor=#d6d6d6
| 81665 ||  || — || April 29, 2000 || Socorro || LINEAR || KOR || align=right | 3.2 km || 
|-id=666 bgcolor=#E9E9E9
| 81666 ||  || — || April 29, 2000 || Anderson Mesa || LONEOS || HNS || align=right | 3.2 km || 
|-id=667 bgcolor=#d6d6d6
| 81667 ||  || — || April 28, 2000 || Socorro || LINEAR || EOS || align=right | 5.0 km || 
|-id=668 bgcolor=#E9E9E9
| 81668 ||  || — || April 27, 2000 || Socorro || LINEAR || — || align=right | 2.7 km || 
|-id=669 bgcolor=#E9E9E9
| 81669 ||  || — || April 25, 2000 || Anderson Mesa || LONEOS || — || align=right | 2.1 km || 
|-id=670 bgcolor=#E9E9E9
| 81670 ||  || — || April 27, 2000 || Anderson Mesa || LONEOS || — || align=right | 2.3 km || 
|-id=671 bgcolor=#E9E9E9
| 81671 ||  || — || April 27, 2000 || Anderson Mesa || LONEOS || RAF || align=right | 2.8 km || 
|-id=672 bgcolor=#E9E9E9
| 81672 ||  || — || April 27, 2000 || Anderson Mesa || LONEOS || — || align=right | 3.6 km || 
|-id=673 bgcolor=#d6d6d6
| 81673 ||  || — || April 24, 2000 || Kitt Peak || Spacewatch || THM || align=right | 5.4 km || 
|-id=674 bgcolor=#E9E9E9
| 81674 || 2000 JC || — || May 2, 2000 || Prescott || P. G. Comba || — || align=right | 4.0 km || 
|-id=675 bgcolor=#d6d6d6
| 81675 || 2000 JO || — || May 1, 2000 || Socorro || LINEAR || — || align=right | 7.2 km || 
|-id=676 bgcolor=#E9E9E9
| 81676 ||  || — || May 1, 2000 || Socorro || LINEAR || — || align=right | 2.6 km || 
|-id=677 bgcolor=#E9E9E9
| 81677 ||  || — || May 2, 2000 || Socorro || LINEAR || — || align=right | 2.4 km || 
|-id=678 bgcolor=#E9E9E9
| 81678 ||  || — || May 3, 2000 || Socorro || LINEAR || EUN || align=right | 2.8 km || 
|-id=679 bgcolor=#E9E9E9
| 81679 ||  || — || May 4, 2000 || Prescott || P. G. Comba || MRX || align=right | 2.5 km || 
|-id=680 bgcolor=#E9E9E9
| 81680 ||  || — || May 1, 2000 || Kitt Peak || Spacewatch || — || align=right | 3.2 km || 
|-id=681 bgcolor=#fefefe
| 81681 ||  || — || May 1, 2000 || Socorro || LINEAR || — || align=right | 2.5 km || 
|-id=682 bgcolor=#E9E9E9
| 81682 ||  || — || May 2, 2000 || Socorro || LINEAR || — || align=right | 4.4 km || 
|-id=683 bgcolor=#E9E9E9
| 81683 ||  || — || May 4, 2000 || Socorro || LINEAR || — || align=right | 6.1 km || 
|-id=684 bgcolor=#E9E9E9
| 81684 ||  || — || May 6, 2000 || Bergisch Gladbach || W. Bickel || MAR || align=right | 3.4 km || 
|-id=685 bgcolor=#d6d6d6
| 81685 ||  || — || May 3, 2000 || Socorro || LINEAR || — || align=right | 4.1 km || 
|-id=686 bgcolor=#E9E9E9
| 81686 ||  || — || May 3, 2000 || Socorro || LINEAR || — || align=right | 7.3 km || 
|-id=687 bgcolor=#E9E9E9
| 81687 ||  || — || May 4, 2000 || Socorro || LINEAR || GEF || align=right | 2.4 km || 
|-id=688 bgcolor=#d6d6d6
| 81688 ||  || — || May 3, 2000 || Socorro || LINEAR || — || align=right | 5.1 km || 
|-id=689 bgcolor=#E9E9E9
| 81689 ||  || — || May 5, 2000 || Socorro || LINEAR || — || align=right | 2.5 km || 
|-id=690 bgcolor=#E9E9E9
| 81690 ||  || — || May 5, 2000 || Socorro || LINEAR || — || align=right | 3.1 km || 
|-id=691 bgcolor=#E9E9E9
| 81691 ||  || — || May 6, 2000 || Socorro || LINEAR || MIT || align=right | 5.6 km || 
|-id=692 bgcolor=#E9E9E9
| 81692 ||  || — || May 6, 2000 || Socorro || LINEAR || EUN || align=right | 3.6 km || 
|-id=693 bgcolor=#d6d6d6
| 81693 ||  || — || May 6, 2000 || Socorro || LINEAR || THM || align=right | 9.1 km || 
|-id=694 bgcolor=#E9E9E9
| 81694 ||  || — || May 3, 2000 || Socorro || LINEAR || — || align=right | 4.4 km || 
|-id=695 bgcolor=#E9E9E9
| 81695 ||  || — || May 4, 2000 || Socorro || LINEAR || — || align=right | 4.6 km || 
|-id=696 bgcolor=#E9E9E9
| 81696 ||  || — || May 5, 2000 || Socorro || LINEAR || — || align=right | 2.9 km || 
|-id=697 bgcolor=#E9E9E9
| 81697 ||  || — || May 5, 2000 || Socorro || LINEAR || — || align=right | 2.0 km || 
|-id=698 bgcolor=#E9E9E9
| 81698 ||  || — || May 5, 2000 || Socorro || LINEAR || JUN || align=right | 3.0 km || 
|-id=699 bgcolor=#E9E9E9
| 81699 ||  || — || May 6, 2000 || Socorro || LINEAR || — || align=right | 2.4 km || 
|-id=700 bgcolor=#E9E9E9
| 81700 ||  || — || May 6, 2000 || Socorro || LINEAR || EUN || align=right | 4.3 km || 
|}

81701–81800 

|-bgcolor=#E9E9E9
| 81701 ||  || — || May 6, 2000 || Socorro || LINEAR || — || align=right | 2.3 km || 
|-id=702 bgcolor=#E9E9E9
| 81702 ||  || — || May 6, 2000 || Socorro || LINEAR || — || align=right | 4.1 km || 
|-id=703 bgcolor=#E9E9E9
| 81703 ||  || — || May 6, 2000 || Socorro || LINEAR || — || align=right | 2.8 km || 
|-id=704 bgcolor=#E9E9E9
| 81704 ||  || — || May 6, 2000 || Socorro || LINEAR || GEF || align=right | 2.7 km || 
|-id=705 bgcolor=#E9E9E9
| 81705 ||  || — || May 6, 2000 || Socorro || LINEAR || — || align=right | 3.8 km || 
|-id=706 bgcolor=#E9E9E9
| 81706 ||  || — || May 6, 2000 || Socorro || LINEAR || — || align=right | 4.0 km || 
|-id=707 bgcolor=#d6d6d6
| 81707 ||  || — || May 6, 2000 || Socorro || LINEAR || — || align=right | 4.3 km || 
|-id=708 bgcolor=#E9E9E9
| 81708 ||  || — || May 7, 2000 || Socorro || LINEAR || — || align=right | 4.9 km || 
|-id=709 bgcolor=#E9E9E9
| 81709 ||  || — || May 7, 2000 || Socorro || LINEAR || PAE || align=right | 5.0 km || 
|-id=710 bgcolor=#E9E9E9
| 81710 ||  || — || May 7, 2000 || Socorro || LINEAR || EUN || align=right | 2.9 km || 
|-id=711 bgcolor=#E9E9E9
| 81711 ||  || — || May 7, 2000 || Socorro || LINEAR || — || align=right | 4.7 km || 
|-id=712 bgcolor=#E9E9E9
| 81712 ||  || — || May 7, 2000 || Socorro || LINEAR || MAR || align=right | 3.1 km || 
|-id=713 bgcolor=#E9E9E9
| 81713 ||  || — || May 7, 2000 || Socorro || LINEAR || — || align=right | 5.1 km || 
|-id=714 bgcolor=#E9E9E9
| 81714 ||  || — || May 7, 2000 || Socorro || LINEAR || — || align=right | 2.4 km || 
|-id=715 bgcolor=#E9E9E9
| 81715 ||  || — || May 7, 2000 || Socorro || LINEAR || — || align=right | 3.2 km || 
|-id=716 bgcolor=#E9E9E9
| 81716 ||  || — || May 7, 2000 || Socorro || LINEAR || — || align=right | 3.7 km || 
|-id=717 bgcolor=#E9E9E9
| 81717 ||  || — || May 7, 2000 || Socorro || LINEAR || — || align=right | 3.3 km || 
|-id=718 bgcolor=#E9E9E9
| 81718 ||  || — || May 7, 2000 || Socorro || LINEAR || EUN || align=right | 3.9 km || 
|-id=719 bgcolor=#E9E9E9
| 81719 ||  || — || May 7, 2000 || Socorro || LINEAR || EUN || align=right | 2.7 km || 
|-id=720 bgcolor=#E9E9E9
| 81720 ||  || — || May 7, 2000 || Socorro || LINEAR || XIZ || align=right | 5.1 km || 
|-id=721 bgcolor=#E9E9E9
| 81721 ||  || — || May 7, 2000 || Socorro || LINEAR || — || align=right | 2.6 km || 
|-id=722 bgcolor=#E9E9E9
| 81722 ||  || — || May 7, 2000 || Socorro || LINEAR || — || align=right | 6.1 km || 
|-id=723 bgcolor=#E9E9E9
| 81723 ||  || — || May 7, 2000 || Socorro || LINEAR || — || align=right | 3.0 km || 
|-id=724 bgcolor=#E9E9E9
| 81724 ||  || — || May 7, 2000 || Socorro || LINEAR || MAR || align=right | 2.7 km || 
|-id=725 bgcolor=#d6d6d6
| 81725 ||  || — || May 7, 2000 || Socorro || LINEAR || KOR || align=right | 3.9 km || 
|-id=726 bgcolor=#d6d6d6
| 81726 ||  || — || May 7, 2000 || Socorro || LINEAR || — || align=right | 6.9 km || 
|-id=727 bgcolor=#E9E9E9
| 81727 ||  || — || May 7, 2000 || Socorro || LINEAR || — || align=right | 6.0 km || 
|-id=728 bgcolor=#d6d6d6
| 81728 ||  || — || May 7, 2000 || Socorro || LINEAR || — || align=right | 7.2 km || 
|-id=729 bgcolor=#E9E9E9
| 81729 ||  || — || May 7, 2000 || Socorro || LINEAR || XIZ || align=right | 2.8 km || 
|-id=730 bgcolor=#d6d6d6
| 81730 ||  || — || May 7, 2000 || Socorro || LINEAR || TIR || align=right | 5.9 km || 
|-id=731 bgcolor=#E9E9E9
| 81731 ||  || — || May 7, 2000 || Socorro || LINEAR || — || align=right | 4.4 km || 
|-id=732 bgcolor=#E9E9E9
| 81732 ||  || — || May 6, 2000 || Socorro || LINEAR || — || align=right | 3.8 km || 
|-id=733 bgcolor=#E9E9E9
| 81733 ||  || — || May 6, 2000 || Socorro || LINEAR || — || align=right | 3.0 km || 
|-id=734 bgcolor=#E9E9E9
| 81734 ||  || — || May 7, 2000 || Socorro || LINEAR || — || align=right | 3.3 km || 
|-id=735 bgcolor=#E9E9E9
| 81735 ||  || — || May 7, 2000 || Socorro || LINEAR || HEN || align=right | 2.0 km || 
|-id=736 bgcolor=#E9E9E9
| 81736 ||  || — || May 7, 2000 || Socorro || LINEAR || — || align=right | 2.8 km || 
|-id=737 bgcolor=#E9E9E9
| 81737 ||  || — || May 7, 2000 || Socorro || LINEAR || — || align=right | 3.0 km || 
|-id=738 bgcolor=#E9E9E9
| 81738 ||  || — || May 7, 2000 || Socorro || LINEAR || — || align=right | 3.1 km || 
|-id=739 bgcolor=#E9E9E9
| 81739 ||  || — || May 7, 2000 || Socorro || LINEAR || — || align=right | 2.5 km || 
|-id=740 bgcolor=#E9E9E9
| 81740 ||  || — || May 7, 2000 || Socorro || LINEAR || — || align=right | 3.1 km || 
|-id=741 bgcolor=#E9E9E9
| 81741 ||  || — || May 7, 2000 || Socorro || LINEAR || — || align=right | 3.0 km || 
|-id=742 bgcolor=#E9E9E9
| 81742 ||  || — || May 9, 2000 || Socorro || LINEAR || — || align=right | 3.8 km || 
|-id=743 bgcolor=#E9E9E9
| 81743 ||  || — || May 9, 2000 || Socorro || LINEAR || GEF || align=right | 2.8 km || 
|-id=744 bgcolor=#E9E9E9
| 81744 ||  || — || May 9, 2000 || Socorro || LINEAR || — || align=right | 5.8 km || 
|-id=745 bgcolor=#E9E9E9
| 81745 ||  || — || May 9, 2000 || Socorro || LINEAR || — || align=right | 2.8 km || 
|-id=746 bgcolor=#E9E9E9
| 81746 ||  || — || May 9, 2000 || Socorro || LINEAR || — || align=right | 5.7 km || 
|-id=747 bgcolor=#E9E9E9
| 81747 ||  || — || May 9, 2000 || Socorro || LINEAR || — || align=right | 3.0 km || 
|-id=748 bgcolor=#E9E9E9
| 81748 ||  || — || May 9, 2000 || Socorro || LINEAR || MAR || align=right | 3.0 km || 
|-id=749 bgcolor=#E9E9E9
| 81749 ||  || — || May 4, 2000 || Socorro || LINEAR || — || align=right | 4.0 km || 
|-id=750 bgcolor=#E9E9E9
| 81750 ||  || — || May 6, 2000 || Socorro || LINEAR || HNA || align=right | 3.0 km || 
|-id=751 bgcolor=#E9E9E9
| 81751 ||  || — || May 6, 2000 || Socorro || LINEAR || ADE || align=right | 5.5 km || 
|-id=752 bgcolor=#E9E9E9
| 81752 ||  || — || May 6, 2000 || Socorro || LINEAR || — || align=right | 2.2 km || 
|-id=753 bgcolor=#E9E9E9
| 81753 ||  || — || May 6, 2000 || Socorro || LINEAR || — || align=right | 5.7 km || 
|-id=754 bgcolor=#E9E9E9
| 81754 ||  || — || May 6, 2000 || Socorro || LINEAR || — || align=right | 4.0 km || 
|-id=755 bgcolor=#E9E9E9
| 81755 ||  || — || May 7, 2000 || Socorro || LINEAR || — || align=right | 6.6 km || 
|-id=756 bgcolor=#E9E9E9
| 81756 ||  || — || May 7, 2000 || Socorro || LINEAR || — || align=right | 5.6 km || 
|-id=757 bgcolor=#E9E9E9
| 81757 ||  || — || May 7, 2000 || Socorro || LINEAR || — || align=right | 5.8 km || 
|-id=758 bgcolor=#E9E9E9
| 81758 ||  || — || May 7, 2000 || Socorro || LINEAR || — || align=right | 2.1 km || 
|-id=759 bgcolor=#E9E9E9
| 81759 ||  || — || May 7, 2000 || Socorro || LINEAR || — || align=right | 3.4 km || 
|-id=760 bgcolor=#E9E9E9
| 81760 ||  || — || May 7, 2000 || Socorro || LINEAR || RAF || align=right | 2.1 km || 
|-id=761 bgcolor=#E9E9E9
| 81761 ||  || — || May 7, 2000 || Socorro || LINEAR || — || align=right | 4.4 km || 
|-id=762 bgcolor=#E9E9E9
| 81762 ||  || — || May 9, 2000 || Socorro || LINEAR || — || align=right | 2.7 km || 
|-id=763 bgcolor=#E9E9E9
| 81763 ||  || — || May 9, 2000 || Socorro || LINEAR || RAF || align=right | 2.5 km || 
|-id=764 bgcolor=#E9E9E9
| 81764 ||  || — || May 9, 2000 || Socorro || LINEAR || WIT || align=right | 3.2 km || 
|-id=765 bgcolor=#E9E9E9
| 81765 ||  || — || May 9, 2000 || Socorro || LINEAR || — || align=right | 2.3 km || 
|-id=766 bgcolor=#E9E9E9
| 81766 ||  || — || May 9, 2000 || Socorro || LINEAR || — || align=right | 4.7 km || 
|-id=767 bgcolor=#d6d6d6
| 81767 ||  || — || May 6, 2000 || Socorro || LINEAR || — || align=right | 5.7 km || 
|-id=768 bgcolor=#d6d6d6
| 81768 ||  || — || May 6, 2000 || Kitt Peak || Spacewatch || EOS || align=right | 4.0 km || 
|-id=769 bgcolor=#E9E9E9
| 81769 ||  || — || May 6, 2000 || Kitt Peak || Spacewatch || — || align=right | 1.9 km || 
|-id=770 bgcolor=#E9E9E9
| 81770 ||  || — || May 7, 2000 || Kitt Peak || Spacewatch || — || align=right | 2.3 km || 
|-id=771 bgcolor=#d6d6d6
| 81771 ||  || — || May 7, 2000 || Kitt Peak || Spacewatch || — || align=right | 4.6 km || 
|-id=772 bgcolor=#E9E9E9
| 81772 ||  || — || May 7, 2000 || Kitt Peak || Spacewatch || — || align=right | 4.3 km || 
|-id=773 bgcolor=#E9E9E9
| 81773 ||  || — || May 2, 2000 || Anderson Mesa || LONEOS || — || align=right | 3.6 km || 
|-id=774 bgcolor=#E9E9E9
| 81774 ||  || — || May 2, 2000 || Anderson Mesa || LONEOS || — || align=right | 2.8 km || 
|-id=775 bgcolor=#d6d6d6
| 81775 ||  || — || May 1, 2000 || Anderson Mesa || LONEOS || EOS || align=right | 4.8 km || 
|-id=776 bgcolor=#E9E9E9
| 81776 ||  || — || May 1, 2000 || Anderson Mesa || LONEOS || — || align=right | 2.0 km || 
|-id=777 bgcolor=#E9E9E9
| 81777 ||  || — || May 2, 2000 || Anderson Mesa || LONEOS || — || align=right | 3.1 km || 
|-id=778 bgcolor=#E9E9E9
| 81778 ||  || — || May 2, 2000 || Anderson Mesa || LONEOS || GEF || align=right | 2.7 km || 
|-id=779 bgcolor=#E9E9E9
| 81779 ||  || — || May 2, 2000 || Anderson Mesa || LONEOS || — || align=right | 2.3 km || 
|-id=780 bgcolor=#E9E9E9
| 81780 ||  || — || May 2, 2000 || Anderson Mesa || LONEOS || INO || align=right | 2.5 km || 
|-id=781 bgcolor=#E9E9E9
| 81781 ||  || — || May 2, 2000 || Kitt Peak || Spacewatch || — || align=right | 2.9 km || 
|-id=782 bgcolor=#E9E9E9
| 81782 ||  || — || May 5, 2000 || Anderson Mesa || LONEOS || EUN || align=right | 3.3 km || 
|-id=783 bgcolor=#E9E9E9
| 81783 ||  || — || May 5, 2000 || Anderson Mesa || LONEOS || — || align=right | 3.5 km || 
|-id=784 bgcolor=#E9E9E9
| 81784 ||  || — || May 3, 2000 || Socorro || LINEAR || AGN || align=right | 3.2 km || 
|-id=785 bgcolor=#E9E9E9
| 81785 ||  || — || May 9, 2000 || Socorro || LINEAR || — || align=right | 4.5 km || 
|-id=786 bgcolor=#E9E9E9
| 81786 ||  || — || May 5, 2000 || Socorro || LINEAR || — || align=right | 5.7 km || 
|-id=787 bgcolor=#E9E9E9
| 81787 ||  || — || May 6, 2000 || Socorro || LINEAR || — || align=right | 4.2 km || 
|-id=788 bgcolor=#E9E9E9
| 81788 ||  || — || May 9, 2000 || Kitt Peak || Spacewatch || GEF || align=right | 2.6 km || 
|-id=789 bgcolor=#E9E9E9
| 81789 ||  || — || May 7, 2000 || Socorro || LINEAR || — || align=right | 3.4 km || 
|-id=790 bgcolor=#E9E9E9
| 81790 Lewislove ||  ||  || May 2, 2000 || Anderson Mesa || L. H. Wasserman || — || align=right | 3.0 km || 
|-id=791 bgcolor=#E9E9E9
| 81791 ||  || — || May 11, 2000 || Anderson Mesa || LONEOS || — || align=right | 1.7 km || 
|-id=792 bgcolor=#E9E9E9
| 81792 ||  || — || May 5, 2000 || Socorro || LINEAR || ADE || align=right | 5.2 km || 
|-id=793 bgcolor=#d6d6d6
| 81793 ||  || — || May 4, 2000 || Socorro || LINEAR || — || align=right | 5.7 km || 
|-id=794 bgcolor=#fefefe
| 81794 ||  || — || May 3, 2000 || Socorro || LINEAR || — || align=right | 3.0 km || 
|-id=795 bgcolor=#d6d6d6
| 81795 ||  || — || May 2, 2000 || Anderson Mesa || LONEOS || — || align=right | 4.6 km || 
|-id=796 bgcolor=#d6d6d6
| 81796 || 2000 KH || — || May 23, 2000 || Prescott || P. G. Comba || — || align=right | 4.5 km || 
|-id=797 bgcolor=#E9E9E9
| 81797 ||  || — || May 26, 2000 || Socorro || LINEAR || — || align=right | 6.8 km || 
|-id=798 bgcolor=#E9E9E9
| 81798 ||  || — || May 23, 2000 || Anderson Mesa || LONEOS || — || align=right | 3.9 km || 
|-id=799 bgcolor=#E9E9E9
| 81799 ||  || — || May 26, 2000 || Socorro || LINEAR || HNS || align=right | 2.6 km || 
|-id=800 bgcolor=#E9E9E9
| 81800 ||  || — || May 26, 2000 || Socorro || LINEAR || BAR || align=right | 3.1 km || 
|}

81801–81900 

|-bgcolor=#E9E9E9
| 81801 ||  || — || May 27, 2000 || Socorro || LINEAR || — || align=right | 3.4 km || 
|-id=802 bgcolor=#E9E9E9
| 81802 ||  || — || May 27, 2000 || Socorro || LINEAR || — || align=right | 5.3 km || 
|-id=803 bgcolor=#E9E9E9
| 81803 ||  || — || May 27, 2000 || Socorro || LINEAR || — || align=right | 6.0 km || 
|-id=804 bgcolor=#d6d6d6
| 81804 ||  || — || May 27, 2000 || Socorro || LINEAR || — || align=right | 5.6 km || 
|-id=805 bgcolor=#d6d6d6
| 81805 ||  || — || May 27, 2000 || Socorro || LINEAR || LAU || align=right | 2.1 km || 
|-id=806 bgcolor=#d6d6d6
| 81806 ||  || — || May 27, 2000 || Socorro || LINEAR || — || align=right | 4.5 km || 
|-id=807 bgcolor=#E9E9E9
| 81807 ||  || — || May 28, 2000 || Socorro || LINEAR || — || align=right | 4.3 km || 
|-id=808 bgcolor=#E9E9E9
| 81808 ||  || — || May 28, 2000 || Socorro || LINEAR || — || align=right | 3.4 km || 
|-id=809 bgcolor=#d6d6d6
| 81809 ||  || — || May 28, 2000 || Socorro || LINEAR || — || align=right | 3.9 km || 
|-id=810 bgcolor=#E9E9E9
| 81810 ||  || — || May 30, 2000 || Socorro || LINEAR || — || align=right | 4.0 km || 
|-id=811 bgcolor=#d6d6d6
| 81811 ||  || — || May 28, 2000 || Socorro || LINEAR || — || align=right | 6.4 km || 
|-id=812 bgcolor=#E9E9E9
| 81812 ||  || — || May 28, 2000 || Socorro || LINEAR || — || align=right | 3.4 km || 
|-id=813 bgcolor=#E9E9E9
| 81813 ||  || — || May 28, 2000 || Socorro || LINEAR || NEM || align=right | 5.6 km || 
|-id=814 bgcolor=#E9E9E9
| 81814 ||  || — || May 28, 2000 || Socorro || LINEAR || — || align=right | 4.8 km || 
|-id=815 bgcolor=#E9E9E9
| 81815 ||  || — || May 28, 2000 || Socorro || LINEAR || — || align=right | 5.0 km || 
|-id=816 bgcolor=#E9E9E9
| 81816 ||  || — || May 28, 2000 || Socorro || LINEAR || — || align=right | 4.0 km || 
|-id=817 bgcolor=#E9E9E9
| 81817 ||  || — || May 27, 2000 || Socorro || LINEAR || — || align=right | 3.4 km || 
|-id=818 bgcolor=#E9E9E9
| 81818 ||  || — || May 27, 2000 || Socorro || LINEAR || — || align=right | 6.8 km || 
|-id=819 bgcolor=#E9E9E9
| 81819 ||  || — || May 27, 2000 || Socorro || LINEAR || — || align=right | 3.2 km || 
|-id=820 bgcolor=#E9E9E9
| 81820 ||  || — || May 24, 2000 || Kitt Peak || Spacewatch || — || align=right | 4.7 km || 
|-id=821 bgcolor=#d6d6d6
| 81821 ||  || — || May 24, 2000 || Kitt Peak || Spacewatch || HYG || align=right | 5.4 km || 
|-id=822 bgcolor=#E9E9E9
| 81822 Jamesearly ||  ||  || May 27, 2000 || OCA-Anza || M. Collins, M. White || — || align=right | 4.2 km || 
|-id=823 bgcolor=#E9E9E9
| 81823 ||  || — || May 30, 2000 || Kitt Peak || Spacewatch || MAR || align=right | 2.6 km || 
|-id=824 bgcolor=#E9E9E9
| 81824 ||  || — || May 27, 2000 || Socorro || LINEAR || — || align=right | 3.5 km || 
|-id=825 bgcolor=#E9E9E9
| 81825 ||  || — || May 28, 2000 || Socorro || LINEAR || — || align=right | 2.8 km || 
|-id=826 bgcolor=#E9E9E9
| 81826 ||  || — || May 28, 2000 || Socorro || LINEAR || HNS || align=right | 4.0 km || 
|-id=827 bgcolor=#d6d6d6
| 81827 ||  || — || May 26, 2000 || Kitt Peak || Spacewatch || KOR || align=right | 3.0 km || 
|-id=828 bgcolor=#d6d6d6
| 81828 ||  || — || May 28, 2000 || Kitt Peak || Spacewatch || — || align=right | 7.2 km || 
|-id=829 bgcolor=#E9E9E9
| 81829 ||  || — || May 27, 2000 || Socorro || LINEAR || — || align=right | 4.7 km || 
|-id=830 bgcolor=#d6d6d6
| 81830 ||  || — || May 27, 2000 || Socorro || LINEAR || — || align=right | 5.3 km || 
|-id=831 bgcolor=#E9E9E9
| 81831 ||  || — || May 27, 2000 || Socorro || LINEAR || — || align=right | 5.4 km || 
|-id=832 bgcolor=#E9E9E9
| 81832 ||  || — || May 27, 2000 || Socorro || LINEAR || — || align=right | 4.2 km || 
|-id=833 bgcolor=#d6d6d6
| 81833 ||  || — || May 27, 2000 || Socorro || LINEAR || — || align=right | 4.4 km || 
|-id=834 bgcolor=#d6d6d6
| 81834 ||  || — || May 27, 2000 || Socorro || LINEAR || EOS || align=right | 4.4 km || 
|-id=835 bgcolor=#E9E9E9
| 81835 ||  || — || May 27, 2000 || Socorro || LINEAR || — || align=right | 6.0 km || 
|-id=836 bgcolor=#E9E9E9
| 81836 ||  || — || May 28, 2000 || Socorro || LINEAR || EUN || align=right | 3.2 km || 
|-id=837 bgcolor=#E9E9E9
| 81837 ||  || — || May 31, 2000 || Kitt Peak || Spacewatch || WIT || align=right | 1.9 km || 
|-id=838 bgcolor=#d6d6d6
| 81838 ||  || — || May 29, 2000 || Socorro || LINEAR || — || align=right | 6.8 km || 
|-id=839 bgcolor=#E9E9E9
| 81839 ||  || — || May 24, 2000 || Anderson Mesa || LONEOS || — || align=right | 2.4 km || 
|-id=840 bgcolor=#E9E9E9
| 81840 ||  || — || May 25, 2000 || Anderson Mesa || LONEOS || — || align=right | 1.8 km || 
|-id=841 bgcolor=#E9E9E9
| 81841 ||  || — || May 27, 2000 || Anderson Mesa || LONEOS || — || align=right | 4.2 km || 
|-id=842 bgcolor=#E9E9E9
| 81842 ||  || — || May 27, 2000 || Anderson Mesa || LONEOS || POS || align=right | 7.2 km || 
|-id=843 bgcolor=#E9E9E9
| 81843 ||  || — || May 27, 2000 || Anderson Mesa || LONEOS || — || align=right | 3.0 km || 
|-id=844 bgcolor=#E9E9E9
| 81844 ||  || — || May 27, 2000 || Socorro || LINEAR || — || align=right | 3.0 km || 
|-id=845 bgcolor=#E9E9E9
| 81845 ||  || — || May 30, 2000 || Anderson Mesa || LONEOS || — || align=right | 2.8 km || 
|-id=846 bgcolor=#E9E9E9
| 81846 ||  || — || May 24, 2000 || Anderson Mesa || LONEOS || — || align=right | 2.8 km || 
|-id=847 bgcolor=#E9E9E9
| 81847 ||  || — || May 24, 2000 || Anderson Mesa || LONEOS || MAR || align=right | 3.0 km || 
|-id=848 bgcolor=#E9E9E9
| 81848 ||  || — || May 24, 2000 || Anderson Mesa || LONEOS || EUN || align=right | 3.3 km || 
|-id=849 bgcolor=#E9E9E9
| 81849 ||  || — || May 24, 2000 || Kitt Peak || Spacewatch || EUN || align=right | 2.9 km || 
|-id=850 bgcolor=#E9E9E9
| 81850 ||  || — || May 25, 2000 || Anderson Mesa || LONEOS || — || align=right | 3.4 km || 
|-id=851 bgcolor=#E9E9E9
| 81851 ||  || — || May 25, 2000 || Anderson Mesa || LONEOS || — || align=right | 4.0 km || 
|-id=852 bgcolor=#E9E9E9
| 81852 ||  || — || May 25, 2000 || Anderson Mesa || LONEOS || AER || align=right | 3.0 km || 
|-id=853 bgcolor=#E9E9E9
| 81853 ||  || — || May 25, 2000 || Anderson Mesa || LONEOS || NEM || align=right | 5.6 km || 
|-id=854 bgcolor=#E9E9E9
| 81854 ||  || — || May 25, 2000 || Anderson Mesa || LONEOS || RAF || align=right | 2.0 km || 
|-id=855 bgcolor=#E9E9E9
| 81855 ||  || — || May 25, 2000 || Anderson Mesa || LONEOS || EUN || align=right | 2.8 km || 
|-id=856 bgcolor=#E9E9E9
| 81856 ||  || — || May 26, 2000 || Anderson Mesa || LONEOS || — || align=right | 3.9 km || 
|-id=857 bgcolor=#E9E9E9
| 81857 ||  || — || May 27, 2000 || Socorro || LINEAR || — || align=right | 2.1 km || 
|-id=858 bgcolor=#E9E9E9
| 81858 ||  || — || May 27, 2000 || Socorro || LINEAR || — || align=right | 1.8 km || 
|-id=859 bgcolor=#E9E9E9
| 81859 Joetaylor ||  ||  || May 29, 2000 || Socorro || LINEAR || — || align=right | 2.7 km || 
|-id=860 bgcolor=#E9E9E9
| 81860 ||  || — || May 28, 2000 || Socorro || LINEAR || — || align=right | 6.8 km || 
|-id=861 bgcolor=#E9E9E9
| 81861 ||  || — || May 28, 2000 || Socorro || LINEAR || — || align=right | 4.7 km || 
|-id=862 bgcolor=#d6d6d6
| 81862 ||  || — || May 27, 2000 || Socorro || LINEAR || — || align=right | 7.5 km || 
|-id=863 bgcolor=#E9E9E9
| 81863 ||  || — || May 27, 2000 || Socorro || LINEAR || — || align=right | 2.3 km || 
|-id=864 bgcolor=#E9E9E9
| 81864 ||  || — || May 27, 2000 || Socorro || LINEAR || — || align=right | 5.0 km || 
|-id=865 bgcolor=#d6d6d6
| 81865 ||  || — || May 27, 2000 || Socorro || LINEAR || EOS || align=right | 5.0 km || 
|-id=866 bgcolor=#E9E9E9
| 81866 ||  || — || May 27, 2000 || Socorro || LINEAR || — || align=right | 4.1 km || 
|-id=867 bgcolor=#E9E9E9
| 81867 ||  || — || May 27, 2000 || Socorro || LINEAR || — || align=right | 3.1 km || 
|-id=868 bgcolor=#E9E9E9
| 81868 ||  || — || May 27, 2000 || Socorro || LINEAR || — || align=right | 3.1 km || 
|-id=869 bgcolor=#E9E9E9
| 81869 ||  || — || May 27, 2000 || Socorro || LINEAR || — || align=right | 5.7 km || 
|-id=870 bgcolor=#E9E9E9
| 81870 ||  || — || June 1, 2000 || Črni Vrh || Črni Vrh || CLO || align=right | 2.6 km || 
|-id=871 bgcolor=#E9E9E9
| 81871 ||  || — || June 4, 2000 || Socorro || LINEAR || MAR || align=right | 3.4 km || 
|-id=872 bgcolor=#d6d6d6
| 81872 ||  || — || June 4, 2000 || Socorro || LINEAR || — || align=right | 7.9 km || 
|-id=873 bgcolor=#E9E9E9
| 81873 ||  || — || June 5, 2000 || Socorro || LINEAR || — || align=right | 5.6 km || 
|-id=874 bgcolor=#E9E9E9
| 81874 ||  || — || June 5, 2000 || Socorro || LINEAR || — || align=right | 3.6 km || 
|-id=875 bgcolor=#E9E9E9
| 81875 ||  || — || June 4, 2000 || Reedy Creek || J. Broughton || — || align=right | 5.0 km || 
|-id=876 bgcolor=#E9E9E9
| 81876 ||  || — || June 5, 2000 || Socorro || LINEAR || WAT || align=right | 4.5 km || 
|-id=877 bgcolor=#E9E9E9
| 81877 ||  || — || June 5, 2000 || Socorro || LINEAR || — || align=right | 3.0 km || 
|-id=878 bgcolor=#E9E9E9
| 81878 ||  || — || June 4, 2000 || Socorro || LINEAR || — || align=right | 5.4 km || 
|-id=879 bgcolor=#E9E9E9
| 81879 ||  || — || June 4, 2000 || Socorro || LINEAR || — || align=right | 3.5 km || 
|-id=880 bgcolor=#E9E9E9
| 81880 ||  || — || June 5, 2000 || Socorro || LINEAR || ADE || align=right | 5.8 km || 
|-id=881 bgcolor=#E9E9E9
| 81881 ||  || — || June 4, 2000 || Kitt Peak || Spacewatch || — || align=right | 3.2 km || 
|-id=882 bgcolor=#d6d6d6
| 81882 ||  || — || June 5, 2000 || Kitt Peak || Spacewatch || CHA || align=right | 4.3 km || 
|-id=883 bgcolor=#E9E9E9
| 81883 ||  || — || June 4, 2000 || Socorro || LINEAR || — || align=right | 3.6 km || 
|-id=884 bgcolor=#d6d6d6
| 81884 ||  || — || June 7, 2000 || Socorro || LINEAR || — || align=right | 12 km || 
|-id=885 bgcolor=#E9E9E9
| 81885 ||  || — || June 8, 2000 || Socorro || LINEAR || — || align=right | 5.9 km || 
|-id=886 bgcolor=#d6d6d6
| 81886 ||  || — || June 8, 2000 || Socorro || LINEAR || — || align=right | 7.5 km || 
|-id=887 bgcolor=#d6d6d6
| 81887 ||  || — || June 9, 2000 || Prescott || P. G. Comba || — || align=right | 13 km || 
|-id=888 bgcolor=#d6d6d6
| 81888 ||  || — || June 1, 2000 || Anderson Mesa || LONEOS || — || align=right | 10 km || 
|-id=889 bgcolor=#E9E9E9
| 81889 ||  || — || June 1, 2000 || Socorro || LINEAR || MAR || align=right | 3.2 km || 
|-id=890 bgcolor=#E9E9E9
| 81890 ||  || — || June 1, 2000 || Socorro || LINEAR || — || align=right | 4.6 km || 
|-id=891 bgcolor=#d6d6d6
| 81891 ||  || — || June 5, 2000 || Anderson Mesa || LONEOS || HYG || align=right | 7.8 km || 
|-id=892 bgcolor=#d6d6d6
| 81892 ||  || — || June 4, 2000 || Haleakala || NEAT || EOS || align=right | 4.5 km || 
|-id=893 bgcolor=#E9E9E9
| 81893 ||  || — || June 4, 2000 || Haleakala || NEAT || — || align=right | 3.1 km || 
|-id=894 bgcolor=#d6d6d6
| 81894 ||  || — || June 6, 2000 || Kitt Peak || Spacewatch || ALA || align=right | 6.9 km || 
|-id=895 bgcolor=#d6d6d6
| 81895 ||  || — || June 5, 2000 || Anderson Mesa || LONEOS || ALA || align=right | 12 km || 
|-id=896 bgcolor=#E9E9E9
| 81896 ||  || — || June 4, 2000 || Socorro || LINEAR || EUN || align=right | 2.4 km || 
|-id=897 bgcolor=#E9E9E9
| 81897 ||  || — || June 4, 2000 || Socorro || LINEAR || — || align=right | 3.8 km || 
|-id=898 bgcolor=#d6d6d6
| 81898 ||  || — || June 4, 2000 || Kitt Peak || Spacewatch || EOS || align=right | 4.4 km || 
|-id=899 bgcolor=#d6d6d6
| 81899 ||  || — || June 3, 2000 || Anderson Mesa || LONEOS || — || align=right | 6.8 km || 
|-id=900 bgcolor=#d6d6d6
| 81900 ||  || — || June 1, 2000 || Haleakala || NEAT || — || align=right | 6.9 km || 
|}

81901–82000 

|-bgcolor=#d6d6d6
| 81901 ||  || — || June 11, 2000 || Socorro || LINEAR || — || align=right | 3.1 km || 
|-id=902 bgcolor=#E9E9E9
| 81902 ||  || — || June 25, 2000 || Socorro || LINEAR || — || align=right | 7.7 km || 
|-id=903 bgcolor=#E9E9E9
| 81903 ||  || — || June 24, 2000 || Socorro || LINEAR || — || align=right | 3.8 km || 
|-id=904 bgcolor=#E9E9E9
| 81904 ||  || — || June 24, 2000 || Socorro || LINEAR || — || align=right | 6.7 km || 
|-id=905 bgcolor=#d6d6d6
| 81905 ||  || — || July 3, 2000 || Kitt Peak || Spacewatch || — || align=right | 6.4 km || 
|-id=906 bgcolor=#E9E9E9
| 81906 ||  || — || July 4, 2000 || Kitt Peak || Spacewatch || — || align=right | 6.8 km || 
|-id=907 bgcolor=#d6d6d6
| 81907 ||  || — || July 5, 2000 || Črni Vrh || Črni Vrh || — || align=right | 12 km || 
|-id=908 bgcolor=#E9E9E9
| 81908 ||  || — || July 6, 2000 || Reedy Creek || J. Broughton || — || align=right | 3.2 km || 
|-id=909 bgcolor=#E9E9E9
| 81909 ||  || — || July 8, 2000 || Haleakala || NEAT || — || align=right | 4.7 km || 
|-id=910 bgcolor=#d6d6d6
| 81910 ||  || — || July 5, 2000 || Kitt Peak || Spacewatch || — || align=right | 7.8 km || 
|-id=911 bgcolor=#E9E9E9
| 81911 ||  || — || July 6, 2000 || Socorro || LINEAR || — || align=right | 7.1 km || 
|-id=912 bgcolor=#E9E9E9
| 81912 ||  || — || July 6, 2000 || Anderson Mesa || LONEOS || — || align=right | 4.0 km || 
|-id=913 bgcolor=#d6d6d6
| 81913 ||  || — || July 10, 2000 || Valinhos || P. R. Holvorcem || — || align=right | 8.6 km || 
|-id=914 bgcolor=#d6d6d6
| 81914 ||  || — || July 12, 2000 || Farpoint || Farpoint Obs. || 7:4 || align=right | 6.7 km || 
|-id=915 bgcolor=#d6d6d6
| 81915 Hartwick ||  ||  || July 15, 2000 || NRC-DAO || D. D. Balam || — || align=right | 8.7 km || 
|-id=916 bgcolor=#d6d6d6
| 81916 ||  || — || July 5, 2000 || Anderson Mesa || LONEOS || — || align=right | 6.7 km || 
|-id=917 bgcolor=#d6d6d6
| 81917 ||  || — || July 5, 2000 || Anderson Mesa || LONEOS || URS || align=right | 8.6 km || 
|-id=918 bgcolor=#d6d6d6
| 81918 ||  || — || July 5, 2000 || Anderson Mesa || LONEOS || URS || align=right | 9.1 km || 
|-id=919 bgcolor=#d6d6d6
| 81919 ||  || — || July 5, 2000 || Anderson Mesa || LONEOS || — || align=right | 7.8 km || 
|-id=920 bgcolor=#E9E9E9
| 81920 ||  || — || July 5, 2000 || Anderson Mesa || LONEOS || — || align=right | 3.6 km || 
|-id=921 bgcolor=#d6d6d6
| 81921 ||  || — || July 7, 2000 || Anderson Mesa || LONEOS || — || align=right | 4.8 km || 
|-id=922 bgcolor=#d6d6d6
| 81922 ||  || — || July 5, 2000 || Anderson Mesa || LONEOS || 7:4 || align=right | 11 km || 
|-id=923 bgcolor=#E9E9E9
| 81923 ||  || — || July 4, 2000 || Anderson Mesa || LONEOS || — || align=right | 4.2 km || 
|-id=924 bgcolor=#E9E9E9
| 81924 ||  || — || July 4, 2000 || Anderson Mesa || LONEOS || — || align=right | 3.8 km || 
|-id=925 bgcolor=#E9E9E9
| 81925 ||  || — || July 4, 2000 || Anderson Mesa || LONEOS || — || align=right | 4.0 km || 
|-id=926 bgcolor=#E9E9E9
| 81926 ||  || — || July 3, 2000 || Socorro || LINEAR || — || align=right | 5.3 km || 
|-id=927 bgcolor=#E9E9E9
| 81927 ||  || — || July 3, 2000 || Socorro || LINEAR || GEF || align=right | 3.2 km || 
|-id=928 bgcolor=#E9E9E9
| 81928 ||  || — || July 2, 2000 || Haleakala || NEAT || — || align=right | 5.8 km || 
|-id=929 bgcolor=#E9E9E9
| 81929 || 2000 OE || — || July 22, 2000 || Reedy Creek || J. Broughton || EUN || align=right | 3.5 km || 
|-id=930 bgcolor=#E9E9E9
| 81930 ||  || — || July 24, 2000 || Socorro || LINEAR || — || align=right | 4.1 km || 
|-id=931 bgcolor=#d6d6d6
| 81931 ||  || — || July 28, 2000 || Višnjan Observatory || K. Korlević || — || align=right | 4.4 km || 
|-id=932 bgcolor=#d6d6d6
| 81932 ||  || — || July 23, 2000 || Socorro || LINEAR || — || align=right | 7.6 km || 
|-id=933 bgcolor=#d6d6d6
| 81933 ||  || — || July 23, 2000 || Socorro || LINEAR || THM || align=right | 5.5 km || 
|-id=934 bgcolor=#d6d6d6
| 81934 ||  || — || July 23, 2000 || Socorro || LINEAR || — || align=right | 4.8 km || 
|-id=935 bgcolor=#d6d6d6
| 81935 ||  || — || July 30, 2000 || Socorro || LINEAR || VER || align=right | 9.5 km || 
|-id=936 bgcolor=#d6d6d6
| 81936 ||  || — || July 30, 2000 || Socorro || LINEAR || — || align=right | 9.1 km || 
|-id=937 bgcolor=#d6d6d6
| 81937 ||  || — || July 30, 2000 || Socorro || LINEAR || — || align=right | 9.5 km || 
|-id=938 bgcolor=#d6d6d6
| 81938 ||  || — || July 30, 2000 || Socorro || LINEAR || ALA || align=right | 10 km || 
|-id=939 bgcolor=#d6d6d6
| 81939 ||  || — || July 30, 2000 || Socorro || LINEAR || — || align=right | 6.6 km || 
|-id=940 bgcolor=#d6d6d6
| 81940 ||  || — || July 30, 2000 || Socorro || LINEAR || — || align=right | 6.2 km || 
|-id=941 bgcolor=#E9E9E9
| 81941 ||  || — || July 30, 2000 || Socorro || LINEAR || ADE || align=right | 4.8 km || 
|-id=942 bgcolor=#E9E9E9
| 81942 ||  || — || July 30, 2000 || Socorro || LINEAR || — || align=right | 5.1 km || 
|-id=943 bgcolor=#E9E9E9
| 81943 ||  || — || July 30, 2000 || Socorro || LINEAR || POS || align=right | 6.1 km || 
|-id=944 bgcolor=#d6d6d6
| 81944 ||  || — || July 30, 2000 || Socorro || LINEAR || — || align=right | 3.8 km || 
|-id=945 bgcolor=#d6d6d6
| 81945 ||  || — || July 30, 2000 || Socorro || LINEAR || — || align=right | 8.3 km || 
|-id=946 bgcolor=#d6d6d6
| 81946 ||  || — || July 29, 2000 || Anderson Mesa || LONEOS || — || align=right | 7.5 km || 
|-id=947 bgcolor=#d6d6d6
| 81947 Fripp ||  ||  || July 31, 2000 || Cerro Tololo || M. W. Buie || — || align=right | 5.1 km || 
|-id=948 bgcolor=#d6d6d6
| 81948 Eno ||  ||  || July 31, 2000 || Cerro Tololo || M. W. Buie || — || align=right | 5.4 km || 
|-id=949 bgcolor=#d6d6d6
| 81949 ||  || — || August 1, 2000 || Socorro || LINEAR || — || align=right | 6.3 km || 
|-id=950 bgcolor=#d6d6d6
| 81950 ||  || — || August 2, 2000 || Socorro || LINEAR || — || align=right | 7.1 km || 
|-id=951 bgcolor=#d6d6d6
| 81951 ||  || — || August 1, 2000 || Socorro || LINEAR || — || align=right | 3.0 km || 
|-id=952 bgcolor=#d6d6d6
| 81952 ||  || — || August 1, 2000 || Kitt Peak || Spacewatch || — || align=right | 6.8 km || 
|-id=953 bgcolor=#d6d6d6
| 81953 ||  || — || August 1, 2000 || Socorro || LINEAR || — || align=right | 4.8 km || 
|-id=954 bgcolor=#d6d6d6
| 81954 ||  || — || August 1, 2000 || Socorro || LINEAR || THM || align=right | 5.6 km || 
|-id=955 bgcolor=#d6d6d6
| 81955 ||  || — || August 1, 2000 || Socorro || LINEAR || THM || align=right | 6.0 km || 
|-id=956 bgcolor=#d6d6d6
| 81956 ||  || — || August 1, 2000 || Socorro || LINEAR || — || align=right | 6.2 km || 
|-id=957 bgcolor=#d6d6d6
| 81957 ||  || — || August 24, 2000 || Socorro || LINEAR || THM || align=right | 5.0 km || 
|-id=958 bgcolor=#d6d6d6
| 81958 ||  || — || August 24, 2000 || Socorro || LINEAR || — || align=right | 6.0 km || 
|-id=959 bgcolor=#d6d6d6
| 81959 ||  || — || August 24, 2000 || Socorro || LINEAR || — || align=right | 5.7 km || 
|-id=960 bgcolor=#d6d6d6
| 81960 ||  || — || August 24, 2000 || Socorro || LINEAR || — || align=right | 7.0 km || 
|-id=961 bgcolor=#d6d6d6
| 81961 ||  || — || August 24, 2000 || Socorro || LINEAR || — || align=right | 4.7 km || 
|-id=962 bgcolor=#d6d6d6
| 81962 ||  || — || August 26, 2000 || Socorro || LINEAR || — || align=right | 6.5 km || 
|-id=963 bgcolor=#E9E9E9
| 81963 ||  || — || August 26, 2000 || Socorro || LINEAR || — || align=right | 4.2 km || 
|-id=964 bgcolor=#d6d6d6
| 81964 ||  || — || August 24, 2000 || Socorro || LINEAR || — || align=right | 4.1 km || 
|-id=965 bgcolor=#d6d6d6
| 81965 ||  || — || August 24, 2000 || Socorro || LINEAR || — || align=right | 4.9 km || 
|-id=966 bgcolor=#d6d6d6
| 81966 ||  || — || August 24, 2000 || Socorro || LINEAR || EOS || align=right | 4.0 km || 
|-id=967 bgcolor=#d6d6d6
| 81967 ||  || — || August 24, 2000 || Socorro || LINEAR || — || align=right | 7.3 km || 
|-id=968 bgcolor=#d6d6d6
| 81968 ||  || — || August 24, 2000 || Socorro || LINEAR || — || align=right | 3.1 km || 
|-id=969 bgcolor=#d6d6d6
| 81969 ||  || — || August 25, 2000 || Socorro || LINEAR || ALA || align=right | 6.5 km || 
|-id=970 bgcolor=#d6d6d6
| 81970 ||  || — || August 25, 2000 || Socorro || LINEAR || THM || align=right | 5.7 km || 
|-id=971 bgcolor=#d6d6d6
| 81971 Turonclavere ||  ||  || August 22, 2000 || Saint-Véran || L. Kotková, J. Montanne || — || align=right | 6.2 km || 
|-id=972 bgcolor=#fefefe
| 81972 ||  || — || August 28, 2000 || Socorro || LINEAR || H || align=right | 1.1 km || 
|-id=973 bgcolor=#d6d6d6
| 81973 ||  || — || August 24, 2000 || Socorro || LINEAR || — || align=right | 9.1 km || 
|-id=974 bgcolor=#d6d6d6
| 81974 ||  || — || August 24, 2000 || Socorro || LINEAR || — || align=right | 3.7 km || 
|-id=975 bgcolor=#d6d6d6
| 81975 ||  || — || August 24, 2000 || Socorro || LINEAR || — || align=right | 6.3 km || 
|-id=976 bgcolor=#d6d6d6
| 81976 ||  || — || August 25, 2000 || Socorro || LINEAR || — || align=right | 5.9 km || 
|-id=977 bgcolor=#d6d6d6
| 81977 ||  || — || August 25, 2000 || Socorro || LINEAR || — || align=right | 8.2 km || 
|-id=978 bgcolor=#d6d6d6
| 81978 ||  || — || August 25, 2000 || Socorro || LINEAR || — || align=right | 7.3 km || 
|-id=979 bgcolor=#d6d6d6
| 81979 ||  || — || August 25, 2000 || Socorro || LINEAR || TEL || align=right | 3.2 km || 
|-id=980 bgcolor=#d6d6d6
| 81980 ||  || — || August 28, 2000 || Socorro || LINEAR || — || align=right | 6.1 km || 
|-id=981 bgcolor=#d6d6d6
| 81981 ||  || — || August 24, 2000 || Socorro || LINEAR || THM || align=right | 5.1 km || 
|-id=982 bgcolor=#E9E9E9
| 81982 ||  || — || August 24, 2000 || Socorro || LINEAR || DOR || align=right | 6.2 km || 
|-id=983 bgcolor=#d6d6d6
| 81983 ||  || — || August 29, 2000 || Socorro || LINEAR || — || align=right | 5.1 km || 
|-id=984 bgcolor=#d6d6d6
| 81984 ||  || — || August 25, 2000 || Socorro || LINEAR || — || align=right | 8.0 km || 
|-id=985 bgcolor=#d6d6d6
| 81985 ||  || — || August 25, 2000 || Socorro || LINEAR || — || align=right | 5.4 km || 
|-id=986 bgcolor=#E9E9E9
| 81986 ||  || — || August 25, 2000 || Socorro || LINEAR || TIN || align=right | 2.5 km || 
|-id=987 bgcolor=#d6d6d6
| 81987 ||  || — || August 26, 2000 || Socorro || LINEAR || — || align=right | 6.0 km || 
|-id=988 bgcolor=#d6d6d6
| 81988 ||  || — || August 26, 2000 || Socorro || LINEAR || — || align=right | 7.4 km || 
|-id=989 bgcolor=#d6d6d6
| 81989 ||  || — || August 28, 2000 || Socorro || LINEAR || TRP || align=right | 6.2 km || 
|-id=990 bgcolor=#d6d6d6
| 81990 ||  || — || August 31, 2000 || Socorro || LINEAR || — || align=right | 8.1 km || 
|-id=991 bgcolor=#d6d6d6
| 81991 ||  || — || August 31, 2000 || Socorro || LINEAR || — || align=right | 6.6 km || 
|-id=992 bgcolor=#d6d6d6
| 81992 ||  || — || August 31, 2000 || Socorro || LINEAR || URS || align=right | 6.6 km || 
|-id=993 bgcolor=#d6d6d6
| 81993 ||  || — || August 24, 2000 || Socorro || LINEAR || — || align=right | 8.6 km || 
|-id=994 bgcolor=#d6d6d6
| 81994 ||  || — || August 26, 2000 || Socorro || LINEAR || — || align=right | 9.9 km || 
|-id=995 bgcolor=#d6d6d6
| 81995 ||  || — || August 26, 2000 || Socorro || LINEAR || HYG || align=right | 5.1 km || 
|-id=996 bgcolor=#d6d6d6
| 81996 ||  || — || August 28, 2000 || Socorro || LINEAR || LIX || align=right | 6.5 km || 
|-id=997 bgcolor=#d6d6d6
| 81997 ||  || — || August 29, 2000 || Socorro || LINEAR || HYG || align=right | 6.2 km || 
|-id=998 bgcolor=#d6d6d6
| 81998 ||  || — || August 31, 2000 || Socorro || LINEAR || — || align=right | 3.3 km || 
|-id=999 bgcolor=#d6d6d6
| 81999 ||  || — || August 31, 2000 || Socorro || LINEAR || THM || align=right | 5.7 km || 
|-id=000 bgcolor=#d6d6d6
| 82000 ||  || — || August 20, 2000 || Anderson Mesa || LONEOS || HYG || align=right | 5.8 km || 
|}

References

External links 
 Discovery Circumstances: Numbered Minor Planets (80001)–(85000) (IAU Minor Planet Center)

0081